

592001–592100 

|-bgcolor=#d6d6d6
| 592001 ||  || — || May 6, 2014 || Haleakala || Pan-STARRS ||  || align=right | 2.7 km || 
|-id=002 bgcolor=#d6d6d6
| 592002 ||  || — || April 28, 2008 || Mount Lemmon || Mount Lemmon Survey ||  || align=right | 2.2 km || 
|-id=003 bgcolor=#fefefe
| 592003 ||  || — || May 28, 2014 || Mount Lemmon || Mount Lemmon Survey ||  || align=right data-sort-value="0.56" | 560 m || 
|-id=004 bgcolor=#E9E9E9
| 592004 ||  || — || October 12, 2007 || Kitt Peak || Spacewatch ||  || align=right data-sort-value="0.91" | 910 m || 
|-id=005 bgcolor=#d6d6d6
| 592005 ||  || — || March 6, 2008 || Mount Lemmon || Mount Lemmon Survey ||  || align=right | 2.3 km || 
|-id=006 bgcolor=#d6d6d6
| 592006 ||  || — || October 31, 2005 || Mount Lemmon || Mount Lemmon Survey ||  || align=right | 2.4 km || 
|-id=007 bgcolor=#d6d6d6
| 592007 ||  || — || May 3, 2014 || Haleakala || Pan-STARRS ||  || align=right | 2.9 km || 
|-id=008 bgcolor=#fefefe
| 592008 ||  || — || October 8, 2008 || Mount Lemmon || Mount Lemmon Survey ||  || align=right data-sort-value="0.52" | 520 m || 
|-id=009 bgcolor=#d6d6d6
| 592009 ||  || — || May 7, 2014 || Haleakala || Pan-STARRS ||  || align=right | 2.2 km || 
|-id=010 bgcolor=#d6d6d6
| 592010 ||  || — || May 27, 2014 || Haleakala || Pan-STARRS ||  || align=right | 2.2 km || 
|-id=011 bgcolor=#d6d6d6
| 592011 ||  || — || November 7, 2010 || Catalina || CSS ||  || align=right | 3.2 km || 
|-id=012 bgcolor=#d6d6d6
| 592012 ||  || — || May 30, 2014 || Haleakala || Pan-STARRS ||  || align=right | 2.9 km || 
|-id=013 bgcolor=#fefefe
| 592013 ||  || — || May 31, 2014 || Haleakala || Pan-STARRS ||  || align=right data-sort-value="0.54" | 540 m || 
|-id=014 bgcolor=#d6d6d6
| 592014 ||  || — || May 21, 2014 || Haleakala || Pan-STARRS ||  || align=right | 2.6 km || 
|-id=015 bgcolor=#d6d6d6
| 592015 ||  || — || October 2, 2016 || Mount Lemmon || Mount Lemmon Survey ||  || align=right | 2.7 km || 
|-id=016 bgcolor=#fefefe
| 592016 ||  || — || May 28, 2014 || Haleakala || Pan-STARRS ||  || align=right data-sort-value="0.49" | 490 m || 
|-id=017 bgcolor=#fefefe
| 592017 ||  || — || May 30, 2014 || Haleakala || Pan-STARRS || H || align=right data-sort-value="0.57" | 570 m || 
|-id=018 bgcolor=#d6d6d6
| 592018 ||  || — || May 20, 2014 || Haleakala || Pan-STARRS ||  || align=right | 2.4 km || 
|-id=019 bgcolor=#d6d6d6
| 592019 ||  || — || May 27, 2014 || Mount Lemmon || Mount Lemmon Survey ||  || align=right | 3.6 km || 
|-id=020 bgcolor=#d6d6d6
| 592020 ||  || — || May 27, 2014 || Haleakala || Pan-STARRS ||  || align=right | 2.3 km || 
|-id=021 bgcolor=#d6d6d6
| 592021 ||  || — || May 4, 2014 || Haleakala || Pan-STARRS ||  || align=right | 2.4 km || 
|-id=022 bgcolor=#d6d6d6
| 592022 ||  || — || December 30, 2007 || Kitt Peak || Spacewatch ||  || align=right | 2.4 km || 
|-id=023 bgcolor=#d6d6d6
| 592023 ||  || — || November 20, 2000 || Apache Point || SDSS Collaboration ||  || align=right | 2.8 km || 
|-id=024 bgcolor=#fefefe
| 592024 ||  || — || June 2, 2014 || Haleakala || Pan-STARRS ||  || align=right data-sort-value="0.69" | 690 m || 
|-id=025 bgcolor=#fefefe
| 592025 ||  || — || June 21, 2014 || Mount Lemmon || Mount Lemmon Survey ||  || align=right data-sort-value="0.74" | 740 m || 
|-id=026 bgcolor=#d6d6d6
| 592026 ||  || — || July 20, 2003 || Palomar || NEAT || THB || align=right | 3.2 km || 
|-id=027 bgcolor=#fefefe
| 592027 ||  || — || June 23, 2014 || Mount Lemmon || Mount Lemmon Survey ||  || align=right data-sort-value="0.57" | 570 m || 
|-id=028 bgcolor=#d6d6d6
| 592028 ||  || — || October 31, 2005 || Mount Lemmon || Mount Lemmon Survey ||  || align=right | 3.5 km || 
|-id=029 bgcolor=#d6d6d6
| 592029 ||  || — || September 18, 2003 || Kitt Peak || Spacewatch ||  || align=right | 2.9 km || 
|-id=030 bgcolor=#d6d6d6
| 592030 ||  || — || October 1, 2000 || Kitt Peak || Spacewatch ||  || align=right | 2.4 km || 
|-id=031 bgcolor=#d6d6d6
| 592031 ||  || — || June 3, 2014 || Haleakala || Pan-STARRS ||  || align=right | 2.6 km || 
|-id=032 bgcolor=#d6d6d6
| 592032 ||  || — || May 28, 2014 || Haleakala || Pan-STARRS ||  || align=right | 2.4 km || 
|-id=033 bgcolor=#fefefe
| 592033 ||  || — || June 26, 2014 || Haleakala || Pan-STARRS ||  || align=right data-sort-value="0.65" | 650 m || 
|-id=034 bgcolor=#d6d6d6
| 592034 ||  || — || April 10, 2013 || Haleakala || Pan-STARRS ||  || align=right | 2.2 km || 
|-id=035 bgcolor=#d6d6d6
| 592035 ||  || — || March 8, 2013 || Haleakala || Pan-STARRS ||  || align=right | 3.5 km || 
|-id=036 bgcolor=#d6d6d6
| 592036 ||  || — || April 13, 2013 || Haleakala || Pan-STARRS ||  || align=right | 3.2 km || 
|-id=037 bgcolor=#d6d6d6
| 592037 ||  || — || February 11, 2012 || Mount Lemmon || Mount Lemmon Survey ||  || align=right | 2.9 km || 
|-id=038 bgcolor=#d6d6d6
| 592038 ||  || — || October 14, 2010 || Mount Lemmon || Mount Lemmon Survey ||  || align=right | 3.3 km || 
|-id=039 bgcolor=#fefefe
| 592039 ||  || — || June 24, 2014 || Mount Lemmon || Mount Lemmon Survey ||  || align=right data-sort-value="0.63" | 630 m || 
|-id=040 bgcolor=#d6d6d6
| 592040 ||  || — || October 9, 2004 || Kitt Peak || Spacewatch ||  || align=right | 3.2 km || 
|-id=041 bgcolor=#d6d6d6
| 592041 ||  || — || November 24, 2011 || Haleakala || Pan-STARRS ||  || align=right | 2.8 km || 
|-id=042 bgcolor=#d6d6d6
| 592042 ||  || — || April 13, 2008 || Mount Lemmon || Mount Lemmon Survey ||  || align=right | 2.6 km || 
|-id=043 bgcolor=#d6d6d6
| 592043 ||  || — || June 21, 2014 || Haleakala || Pan-STARRS ||  || align=right | 3.5 km || 
|-id=044 bgcolor=#C2E0FF
| 592044 ||  || — || July 27, 2011 || Haleakala || Pan-STARRS || cubewano (hot) || align=right | 261 km || 
|-id=045 bgcolor=#fefefe
| 592045 ||  || — || June 24, 2014 || Haleakala || Pan-STARRS ||  || align=right data-sort-value="0.58" | 580 m || 
|-id=046 bgcolor=#d6d6d6
| 592046 ||  || — || June 29, 2014 || Haleakala || Pan-STARRS ||  || align=right | 2.5 km || 
|-id=047 bgcolor=#d6d6d6
| 592047 ||  || — || June 29, 2014 || Haleakala || Pan-STARRS ||  || align=right | 2.9 km || 
|-id=048 bgcolor=#d6d6d6
| 592048 ||  || — || June 21, 2014 || Haleakala || Pan-STARRS ||  || align=right | 3.6 km || 
|-id=049 bgcolor=#d6d6d6
| 592049 ||  || — || June 28, 2014 || Haleakala || Pan-STARRS ||  || align=right | 2.9 km || 
|-id=050 bgcolor=#d6d6d6
| 592050 ||  || — || June 19, 2014 || Haleakala || Pan-STARRS ||  || align=right | 2.4 km || 
|-id=051 bgcolor=#d6d6d6
| 592051 ||  || — || June 24, 2014 || Haleakala || Pan-STARRS ||  || align=right | 2.4 km || 
|-id=052 bgcolor=#d6d6d6
| 592052 ||  || — || June 24, 2014 || Haleakala || Pan-STARRS ||  || align=right | 2.2 km || 
|-id=053 bgcolor=#d6d6d6
| 592053 ||  || — || January 8, 2013 || Mount Lemmon || Mount Lemmon Survey ||  || align=right | 4.2 km || 
|-id=054 bgcolor=#d6d6d6
| 592054 ||  || — || January 25, 2007 || Kitt Peak || Spacewatch ||  || align=right | 2.6 km || 
|-id=055 bgcolor=#d6d6d6
| 592055 ||  || — || July 1, 2014 || Haleakala || Pan-STARRS ||  || align=right | 2.3 km || 
|-id=056 bgcolor=#d6d6d6
| 592056 ||  || — || March 15, 2007 || Kitt Peak || Spacewatch ||  || align=right | 2.5 km || 
|-id=057 bgcolor=#d6d6d6
| 592057 ||  || — || January 26, 2012 || Mount Lemmon || Mount Lemmon Survey ||  || align=right | 2.5 km || 
|-id=058 bgcolor=#fefefe
| 592058 ||  || — || September 3, 2008 || Kitt Peak || Spacewatch ||  || align=right data-sort-value="0.59" | 590 m || 
|-id=059 bgcolor=#d6d6d6
| 592059 ||  || — || August 16, 2009 || Kitt Peak || Spacewatch ||  || align=right | 2.2 km || 
|-id=060 bgcolor=#d6d6d6
| 592060 ||  || — || March 13, 2007 || Kitt Peak || Spacewatch ||  || align=right | 3.0 km || 
|-id=061 bgcolor=#d6d6d6
| 592061 ||  || — || June 1, 2014 || Haleakala || Pan-STARRS ||  || align=right | 3.2 km || 
|-id=062 bgcolor=#d6d6d6
| 592062 ||  || — || July 23, 2003 || Palomar || NEAT ||  || align=right | 3.9 km || 
|-id=063 bgcolor=#d6d6d6
| 592063 ||  || — || July 2, 2014 || Haleakala || Pan-STARRS ||  || align=right | 2.8 km || 
|-id=064 bgcolor=#C2E0FF
| 592064 ||  || — || August 9, 2013 || Haleakala || Pan-STARRS || other TNO || align=right | 262 km || 
|-id=065 bgcolor=#d6d6d6
| 592065 ||  || — || April 6, 2013 || Mount Lemmon || Mount Lemmon Survey ||  || align=right | 1.7 km || 
|-id=066 bgcolor=#d6d6d6
| 592066 ||  || — || July 2, 2014 || Haleakala || Pan-STARRS ||  || align=right | 2.5 km || 
|-id=067 bgcolor=#E9E9E9
| 592067 ||  || — || July 8, 2014 || Haleakala || Pan-STARRS ||  || align=right data-sort-value="0.88" | 880 m || 
|-id=068 bgcolor=#d6d6d6
| 592068 ||  || — || July 4, 2014 || Haleakala || Pan-STARRS ||  || align=right | 2.2 km || 
|-id=069 bgcolor=#fefefe
| 592069 ||  || — || July 4, 2014 || Haleakala || Pan-STARRS ||  || align=right data-sort-value="0.59" | 590 m || 
|-id=070 bgcolor=#d6d6d6
| 592070 ||  || — || July 1, 2014 || Haleakala || Pan-STARRS ||  || align=right | 2.6 km || 
|-id=071 bgcolor=#fefefe
| 592071 ||  || — || December 1, 2008 || Kitt Peak || Spacewatch ||  || align=right data-sort-value="0.80" | 800 m || 
|-id=072 bgcolor=#fefefe
| 592072 ||  || — || September 21, 2011 || Kitt Peak || Spacewatch ||  || align=right data-sort-value="0.76" | 760 m || 
|-id=073 bgcolor=#d6d6d6
| 592073 ||  || — || March 15, 2013 || Kitt Peak || Spacewatch ||  || align=right | 2.3 km || 
|-id=074 bgcolor=#d6d6d6
| 592074 ||  || — || December 3, 2010 || Mount Lemmon || Mount Lemmon Survey ||  || align=right | 2.4 km || 
|-id=075 bgcolor=#d6d6d6
| 592075 ||  || — || July 25, 2014 || Haleakala || Pan-STARRS || 7:4 || align=right | 2.8 km || 
|-id=076 bgcolor=#fefefe
| 592076 ||  || — || January 5, 2013 || Kitt Peak || Spacewatch ||  || align=right data-sort-value="0.56" | 560 m || 
|-id=077 bgcolor=#d6d6d6
| 592077 ||  || — || August 28, 2009 || Kitt Peak || Spacewatch ||  || align=right | 1.7 km || 
|-id=078 bgcolor=#d6d6d6
| 592078 ||  || — || January 2, 2011 || Mount Lemmon || Mount Lemmon Survey ||  || align=right | 2.2 km || 
|-id=079 bgcolor=#d6d6d6
| 592079 ||  || — || July 25, 2014 || Haleakala || Pan-STARRS ||  || align=right | 2.7 km || 
|-id=080 bgcolor=#d6d6d6
| 592080 ||  || — || January 30, 2006 || Kitt Peak || Spacewatch ||  || align=right | 2.5 km || 
|-id=081 bgcolor=#fefefe
| 592081 ||  || — || September 12, 2001 || Kitt Peak || L. H. Wasserman, E. L. Ryan ||  || align=right data-sort-value="0.67" | 670 m || 
|-id=082 bgcolor=#fefefe
| 592082 ||  || — || November 21, 2008 || Mount Lemmon || Mount Lemmon Survey ||  || align=right data-sort-value="0.62" | 620 m || 
|-id=083 bgcolor=#d6d6d6
| 592083 ||  || — || March 16, 2012 || Mount Lemmon || Mount Lemmon Survey ||  || align=right | 2.7 km || 
|-id=084 bgcolor=#d6d6d6
| 592084 ||  || — || February 14, 2012 || Haleakala || Pan-STARRS ||  || align=right | 2.5 km || 
|-id=085 bgcolor=#fefefe
| 592085 ||  || — || September 28, 2008 || Mount Lemmon || Mount Lemmon Survey ||  || align=right data-sort-value="0.62" | 620 m || 
|-id=086 bgcolor=#d6d6d6
| 592086 ||  || — || January 26, 2012 || Haleakala || Pan-STARRS ||  || align=right | 2.5 km || 
|-id=087 bgcolor=#fefefe
| 592087 ||  || — || December 23, 2012 || Haleakala || Pan-STARRS ||  || align=right data-sort-value="0.57" | 570 m || 
|-id=088 bgcolor=#d6d6d6
| 592088 ||  || — || September 10, 2010 || Kitt Peak || Spacewatch ||  || align=right | 3.1 km || 
|-id=089 bgcolor=#fefefe
| 592089 ||  || — || June 20, 2014 || Haleakala || Pan-STARRS ||  || align=right data-sort-value="0.55" | 550 m || 
|-id=090 bgcolor=#d6d6d6
| 592090 ||  || — || August 20, 2009 || Kitt Peak || Spacewatch ||  || align=right | 3.2 km || 
|-id=091 bgcolor=#fefefe
| 592091 ||  || — || February 16, 2010 || Kitt Peak || Spacewatch ||  || align=right data-sort-value="0.59" | 590 m || 
|-id=092 bgcolor=#d6d6d6
| 592092 ||  || — || January 18, 2012 || Bergisch Gladbach || W. Bickel ||  || align=right | 2.9 km || 
|-id=093 bgcolor=#d6d6d6
| 592093 ||  || — || August 29, 2009 || Bergisch Gladbach || W. Bickel ||  || align=right | 3.9 km || 
|-id=094 bgcolor=#d6d6d6
| 592094 ||  || — || January 19, 2012 || Kitt Peak || Spacewatch ||  || align=right | 2.4 km || 
|-id=095 bgcolor=#fefefe
| 592095 ||  || — || May 7, 2010 || Mount Lemmon || Mount Lemmon Survey ||  || align=right data-sort-value="0.85" | 850 m || 
|-id=096 bgcolor=#d6d6d6
| 592096 ||  || — || April 16, 2013 || Haleakala || Pan-STARRS || 7:4 || align=right | 2.8 km || 
|-id=097 bgcolor=#fefefe
| 592097 ||  || — || July 27, 2014 || Haleakala || Pan-STARRS ||  || align=right data-sort-value="0.59" | 590 m || 
|-id=098 bgcolor=#E9E9E9
| 592098 ||  || — || May 2, 2005 || Kitt Peak || Spacewatch ||  || align=right | 1.4 km || 
|-id=099 bgcolor=#d6d6d6
| 592099 ||  || — || June 29, 2014 || Haleakala || Pan-STARRS ||  || align=right | 2.9 km || 
|-id=100 bgcolor=#d6d6d6
| 592100 ||  || — || November 30, 2010 || Mount Lemmon || Mount Lemmon Survey ||  || align=right | 3.0 km || 
|}

592101–592200 

|-bgcolor=#fefefe
| 592101 ||  || — || March 15, 2010 || Mount Lemmon || Mount Lemmon Survey ||  || align=right data-sort-value="0.54" | 540 m || 
|-id=102 bgcolor=#fefefe
| 592102 ||  || — || January 20, 2009 || Kitt Peak || Spacewatch ||  || align=right data-sort-value="0.74" | 740 m || 
|-id=103 bgcolor=#fefefe
| 592103 ||  || — || September 4, 2007 || Mount Lemmon || Mount Lemmon Survey ||  || align=right data-sort-value="0.64" | 640 m || 
|-id=104 bgcolor=#fefefe
| 592104 ||  || — || January 31, 2009 || Mount Lemmon || Mount Lemmon Survey ||  || align=right data-sort-value="0.70" | 700 m || 
|-id=105 bgcolor=#fefefe
| 592105 ||  || — || September 4, 2011 || Haleakala || Pan-STARRS ||  || align=right data-sort-value="0.62" | 620 m || 
|-id=106 bgcolor=#fefefe
| 592106 ||  || — || October 23, 2008 || Kitt Peak || Spacewatch ||  || align=right data-sort-value="0.56" | 560 m || 
|-id=107 bgcolor=#fefefe
| 592107 ||  || — || September 21, 2008 || Kitt Peak || Spacewatch ||  || align=right data-sort-value="0.67" | 670 m || 
|-id=108 bgcolor=#fefefe
| 592108 ||  || — || May 9, 2014 || Haleakala || Pan-STARRS ||  || align=right data-sort-value="0.49" | 490 m || 
|-id=109 bgcolor=#fefefe
| 592109 ||  || — || March 16, 2010 || Mount Lemmon || Mount Lemmon Survey ||  || align=right data-sort-value="0.53" | 530 m || 
|-id=110 bgcolor=#fefefe
| 592110 ||  || — || April 20, 2007 || Kitt Peak || Spacewatch ||  || align=right data-sort-value="0.47" | 470 m || 
|-id=111 bgcolor=#fefefe
| 592111 ||  || — || January 20, 2013 || Kitt Peak || Spacewatch ||  || align=right data-sort-value="0.64" | 640 m || 
|-id=112 bgcolor=#fefefe
| 592112 ||  || — || October 16, 2001 || Palomar || NEAT ||  || align=right data-sort-value="0.71" | 710 m || 
|-id=113 bgcolor=#d6d6d6
| 592113 ||  || — || February 10, 2007 || Mount Lemmon || Mount Lemmon Survey ||  || align=right | 2.9 km || 
|-id=114 bgcolor=#d6d6d6
| 592114 ||  || — || March 2, 2012 || Mount Lemmon || Mount Lemmon Survey ||  || align=right | 2.4 km || 
|-id=115 bgcolor=#d6d6d6
| 592115 ||  || — || January 23, 2011 || Mount Lemmon || Mount Lemmon Survey || 7:4 || align=right | 2.8 km || 
|-id=116 bgcolor=#d6d6d6
| 592116 ||  || — || August 16, 2009 || Kitt Peak || Spacewatch ||  || align=right | 3.5 km || 
|-id=117 bgcolor=#fefefe
| 592117 ||  || — || October 8, 2008 || Kitt Peak || Spacewatch ||  || align=right data-sort-value="0.55" | 550 m || 
|-id=118 bgcolor=#d6d6d6
| 592118 ||  || — || July 29, 2014 || Haleakala || Pan-STARRS ||  || align=right | 2.8 km || 
|-id=119 bgcolor=#d6d6d6
| 592119 ||  || — || October 22, 2003 || Kitt Peak || Spacewatch || 7:4 || align=right | 2.7 km || 
|-id=120 bgcolor=#d6d6d6
| 592120 ||  || — || August 29, 2009 || Kitt Peak || Spacewatch ||  || align=right | 2.3 km || 
|-id=121 bgcolor=#d6d6d6
| 592121 ||  || — || June 29, 2014 || Haleakala || Pan-STARRS ||  || align=right | 2.8 km || 
|-id=122 bgcolor=#fefefe
| 592122 ||  || — || March 18, 2010 || Mount Lemmon || Mount Lemmon Survey ||  || align=right data-sort-value="0.55" | 550 m || 
|-id=123 bgcolor=#d6d6d6
| 592123 ||  || — || November 8, 2010 || Mount Lemmon || Mount Lemmon Survey ||  || align=right | 2.8 km || 
|-id=124 bgcolor=#fefefe
| 592124 ||  || — || September 13, 2004 || Kitt Peak || Spacewatch ||  || align=right data-sort-value="0.75" | 750 m || 
|-id=125 bgcolor=#fefefe
| 592125 ||  || — || September 26, 2011 || Haleakala || Pan-STARRS ||  || align=right data-sort-value="0.52" | 520 m || 
|-id=126 bgcolor=#d6d6d6
| 592126 ||  || — || April 16, 2013 || Haleakala || Pan-STARRS ||  || align=right | 2.4 km || 
|-id=127 bgcolor=#fefefe
| 592127 ||  || — || September 10, 2007 || Kitt Peak || Spacewatch ||  || align=right data-sort-value="0.69" | 690 m || 
|-id=128 bgcolor=#fefefe
| 592128 ||  || — || May 31, 2014 || Haleakala || Pan-STARRS ||  || align=right data-sort-value="0.74" | 740 m || 
|-id=129 bgcolor=#d6d6d6
| 592129 ||  || — || July 29, 2014 || Haleakala || Pan-STARRS ||  || align=right | 2.3 km || 
|-id=130 bgcolor=#d6d6d6
| 592130 ||  || — || August 22, 2004 || Kitt Peak || Spacewatch ||  || align=right | 1.9 km || 
|-id=131 bgcolor=#d6d6d6
| 592131 ||  || — || September 30, 2010 || Mount Lemmon || Mount Lemmon Survey ||  || align=right | 2.2 km || 
|-id=132 bgcolor=#d6d6d6
| 592132 ||  || — || July 27, 2014 || Haleakala || Pan-STARRS ||  || align=right | 2.6 km || 
|-id=133 bgcolor=#fefefe
| 592133 ||  || — || July 27, 2014 || Haleakala || Pan-STARRS ||  || align=right data-sort-value="0.46" | 460 m || 
|-id=134 bgcolor=#d6d6d6
| 592134 ||  || — || June 26, 2014 || Haleakala || Pan-STARRS ||  || align=right | 2.4 km || 
|-id=135 bgcolor=#d6d6d6
| 592135 ||  || — || April 19, 2013 || Haleakala || Pan-STARRS ||  || align=right | 3.0 km || 
|-id=136 bgcolor=#fefefe
| 592136 ||  || — || December 4, 2008 || Kitt Peak || Spacewatch ||  || align=right data-sort-value="0.63" | 630 m || 
|-id=137 bgcolor=#d6d6d6
| 592137 ||  || — || August 26, 2003 || Cerro Tololo || Cerro Tololo Obs. || VER || align=right | 2.6 km || 
|-id=138 bgcolor=#fefefe
| 592138 ||  || — || March 11, 2013 || Mount Lemmon || Mount Lemmon Survey ||  || align=right data-sort-value="0.62" | 620 m || 
|-id=139 bgcolor=#d6d6d6
| 592139 ||  || — || September 23, 2008 || Mount Lemmon || Mount Lemmon Survey || 7:4 || align=right | 2.8 km || 
|-id=140 bgcolor=#d6d6d6
| 592140 ||  || — || January 29, 2012 || Mount Lemmon || Mount Lemmon Survey ||  || align=right | 2.8 km || 
|-id=141 bgcolor=#d6d6d6
| 592141 ||  || — || December 27, 2011 || Mount Lemmon || Mount Lemmon Survey ||  || align=right | 2.8 km || 
|-id=142 bgcolor=#d6d6d6
| 592142 ||  || — || June 21, 2014 || Haleakala || Pan-STARRS ||  || align=right | 3.2 km || 
|-id=143 bgcolor=#d6d6d6
| 592143 ||  || — || March 13, 2008 || Kitt Peak || Spacewatch ||  || align=right | 1.9 km || 
|-id=144 bgcolor=#d6d6d6
| 592144 ||  || — || September 17, 2009 || Kitt Peak || Spacewatch ||  || align=right | 2.6 km || 
|-id=145 bgcolor=#fefefe
| 592145 ||  || — || October 28, 2011 || Mount Lemmon || Mount Lemmon Survey ||  || align=right data-sort-value="0.60" | 600 m || 
|-id=146 bgcolor=#d6d6d6
| 592146 ||  || — || February 14, 2012 || Haleakala || Pan-STARRS ||  || align=right | 2.3 km || 
|-id=147 bgcolor=#C2E0FF
| 592147 ||  || — || July 25, 2014 || Haleakala || Pan-STARRS || cubewano (cold) || align=right | 190 km || 
|-id=148 bgcolor=#C2E0FF
| 592148 ||  || — || July 31, 2014 || Haleakala || Pan-STARRS || cubewano (cold)critical || align=right | 263 km || 
|-id=149 bgcolor=#C2E0FF
| 592149 ||  || — || July 28, 2014 || Haleakala || Pan-STARRS || SDO || align=right | 157 km || 
|-id=150 bgcolor=#d6d6d6
| 592150 ||  || — || July 27, 2014 || Haleakala || Pan-STARRS ||  || align=right | 2.2 km || 
|-id=151 bgcolor=#d6d6d6
| 592151 ||  || — || September 22, 2003 || Kitt Peak || Spacewatch ||  || align=right | 3.5 km || 
|-id=152 bgcolor=#fefefe
| 592152 ||  || — || August 10, 2007 || Kitt Peak || Spacewatch ||  || align=right data-sort-value="0.80" | 800 m || 
|-id=153 bgcolor=#fefefe
| 592153 ||  || — || June 5, 2014 || Haleakala || Pan-STARRS ||  || align=right data-sort-value="0.55" | 550 m || 
|-id=154 bgcolor=#fefefe
| 592154 ||  || — || September 28, 2011 || Kitt Peak || Spacewatch ||  || align=right data-sort-value="0.56" | 560 m || 
|-id=155 bgcolor=#fefefe
| 592155 ||  || — || February 14, 2013 || Mount Lemmon || Mount Lemmon Survey ||  || align=right data-sort-value="0.66" | 660 m || 
|-id=156 bgcolor=#fefefe
| 592156 ||  || — || January 4, 2012 || Mount Lemmon || Mount Lemmon Survey ||  || align=right data-sort-value="0.80" | 800 m || 
|-id=157 bgcolor=#fefefe
| 592157 ||  || — || February 8, 2013 || Haleakala || Pan-STARRS ||  || align=right data-sort-value="0.65" | 650 m || 
|-id=158 bgcolor=#d6d6d6
| 592158 ||  || — || July 9, 2003 || Kitt Peak || Spacewatch ||  || align=right | 3.3 km || 
|-id=159 bgcolor=#d6d6d6
| 592159 ||  || — || September 5, 2008 || Kitt Peak || Spacewatch || 7:4 || align=right | 3.0 km || 
|-id=160 bgcolor=#d6d6d6
| 592160 ||  || — || December 5, 2010 || Mount Lemmon || Mount Lemmon Survey ||  || align=right | 2.6 km || 
|-id=161 bgcolor=#fefefe
| 592161 ||  || — || July 26, 2014 || Haleakala || Pan-STARRS ||  || align=right data-sort-value="0.61" | 610 m || 
|-id=162 bgcolor=#d6d6d6
| 592162 ||  || — || September 18, 2003 || Palomar || NEAT ||  || align=right | 3.8 km || 
|-id=163 bgcolor=#fefefe
| 592163 ||  || — || February 5, 2009 || Kitt Peak || Spacewatch ||  || align=right data-sort-value="0.64" | 640 m || 
|-id=164 bgcolor=#E9E9E9
| 592164 ||  || — || July 12, 2005 || Kitt Peak || Spacewatch ||  || align=right | 2.0 km || 
|-id=165 bgcolor=#fefefe
| 592165 ||  || — || August 6, 2014 || Haleakala || Pan-STARRS ||  || align=right data-sort-value="0.72" | 720 m || 
|-id=166 bgcolor=#d6d6d6
| 592166 ||  || — || August 3, 2014 || Haleakala || Pan-STARRS ||  || align=right | 1.5 km || 
|-id=167 bgcolor=#d6d6d6
| 592167 ||  || — || October 3, 2003 || Kitt Peak || Spacewatch || 7:4 || align=right | 2.7 km || 
|-id=168 bgcolor=#d6d6d6
| 592168 ||  || — || September 30, 2009 || Mount Lemmon || Mount Lemmon Survey ||  || align=right | 3.1 km || 
|-id=169 bgcolor=#d6d6d6
| 592169 ||  || — || September 15, 2009 || Kitt Peak || Spacewatch ||  || align=right | 2.9 km || 
|-id=170 bgcolor=#fefefe
| 592170 ||  || — || November 24, 2011 || Zelenchukskaya Stn || T. V. Kryachko, B. Satovski ||  || align=right data-sort-value="0.87" | 870 m || 
|-id=171 bgcolor=#d6d6d6
| 592171 ||  || — || September 29, 2001 || Palomar || NEAT || 7:4 || align=right | 4.9 km || 
|-id=172 bgcolor=#d6d6d6
| 592172 ||  || — || January 7, 2006 || Kitt Peak || Spacewatch ||  || align=right | 2.4 km || 
|-id=173 bgcolor=#d6d6d6
| 592173 ||  || — || December 11, 2010 || Mount Lemmon || Mount Lemmon Survey || 7:4 || align=right | 3.2 km || 
|-id=174 bgcolor=#d6d6d6
| 592174 ||  || — || August 23, 2003 || Palomar || NEAT ||  || align=right | 3.3 km || 
|-id=175 bgcolor=#d6d6d6
| 592175 ||  || — || July 4, 2014 || Haleakala || Pan-STARRS ||  || align=right | 2.6 km || 
|-id=176 bgcolor=#fefefe
| 592176 ||  || — || August 25, 2004 || Kitt Peak || Spacewatch ||  || align=right data-sort-value="0.46" | 460 m || 
|-id=177 bgcolor=#fefefe
| 592177 ||  || — || October 25, 2011 || Haleakala || Pan-STARRS ||  || align=right data-sort-value="0.41" | 410 m || 
|-id=178 bgcolor=#d6d6d6
| 592178 ||  || — || July 2, 2014 || Haleakala || Pan-STARRS ||  || align=right | 2.0 km || 
|-id=179 bgcolor=#fefefe
| 592179 ||  || — || March 13, 2013 || Haleakala || Pan-STARRS ||  || align=right data-sort-value="0.60" | 600 m || 
|-id=180 bgcolor=#fefefe
| 592180 ||  || — || September 27, 2011 || Mount Lemmon || Mount Lemmon Survey ||  || align=right data-sort-value="0.48" | 480 m || 
|-id=181 bgcolor=#d6d6d6
| 592181 ||  || — || July 1, 2014 || Haleakala || Pan-STARRS ||  || align=right | 2.7 km || 
|-id=182 bgcolor=#fefefe
| 592182 ||  || — || July 3, 2014 || Haleakala || Pan-STARRS ||  || align=right data-sort-value="0.56" | 560 m || 
|-id=183 bgcolor=#fefefe
| 592183 ||  || — || September 19, 2011 || Haleakala || Pan-STARRS ||  || align=right data-sort-value="0.70" | 700 m || 
|-id=184 bgcolor=#d6d6d6
| 592184 ||  || — || November 14, 2010 || Kitt Peak || Spacewatch ||  || align=right | 3.1 km || 
|-id=185 bgcolor=#fefefe
| 592185 ||  || — || November 30, 2011 || Mount Lemmon || Mount Lemmon Survey ||  || align=right data-sort-value="0.56" | 560 m || 
|-id=186 bgcolor=#fefefe
| 592186 ||  || — || July 1, 2014 || Haleakala || Pan-STARRS ||  || align=right data-sort-value="0.70" | 700 m || 
|-id=187 bgcolor=#d6d6d6
| 592187 ||  || — || March 11, 2007 || Kitt Peak || Spacewatch ||  || align=right | 3.5 km || 
|-id=188 bgcolor=#fefefe
| 592188 ||  || — || August 20, 2014 || Haleakala || Pan-STARRS ||  || align=right data-sort-value="0.62" | 620 m || 
|-id=189 bgcolor=#fefefe
| 592189 ||  || — || November 20, 2008 || Kitt Peak || Spacewatch ||  || align=right data-sort-value="0.71" | 710 m || 
|-id=190 bgcolor=#fefefe
| 592190 ||  || — || January 5, 2013 || Mount Lemmon || Mount Lemmon Survey ||  || align=right data-sort-value="0.65" | 650 m || 
|-id=191 bgcolor=#fefefe
| 592191 ||  || — || January 13, 2003 || Kitt Peak || Spacewatch ||  || align=right data-sort-value="0.66" | 660 m || 
|-id=192 bgcolor=#fefefe
| 592192 ||  || — || January 20, 2013 || Mount Lemmon || Mount Lemmon Survey ||  || align=right data-sort-value="0.52" | 520 m || 
|-id=193 bgcolor=#fefefe
| 592193 ||  || — || December 30, 2005 || Kitt Peak || Spacewatch ||  || align=right data-sort-value="0.56" | 560 m || 
|-id=194 bgcolor=#fefefe
| 592194 ||  || — || August 20, 2014 || Haleakala || Pan-STARRS ||  || align=right data-sort-value="0.52" | 520 m || 
|-id=195 bgcolor=#d6d6d6
| 592195 ||  || — || October 24, 2009 || Kitt Peak || Spacewatch ||  || align=right | 1.9 km || 
|-id=196 bgcolor=#d6d6d6
| 592196 ||  || — || February 1, 2006 || Mount Lemmon || Mount Lemmon Survey ||  || align=right | 1.7 km || 
|-id=197 bgcolor=#fefefe
| 592197 ||  || — || March 8, 2013 || Haleakala || Pan-STARRS ||  || align=right data-sort-value="0.53" | 530 m || 
|-id=198 bgcolor=#d6d6d6
| 592198 ||  || — || October 22, 2009 || Mount Lemmon || Mount Lemmon Survey ||  || align=right | 2.0 km || 
|-id=199 bgcolor=#fefefe
| 592199 ||  || — || October 23, 2011 || Mount Lemmon || Mount Lemmon Survey ||  || align=right data-sort-value="0.67" | 670 m || 
|-id=200 bgcolor=#fefefe
| 592200 ||  || — || August 20, 2014 || Haleakala || Pan-STARRS ||  || align=right data-sort-value="0.57" | 570 m || 
|}

592201–592300 

|-bgcolor=#fefefe
| 592201 ||  || — || March 8, 2013 || Haleakala || Pan-STARRS ||  || align=right data-sort-value="0.51" | 510 m || 
|-id=202 bgcolor=#E9E9E9
| 592202 ||  || — || October 25, 2005 || Kitt Peak || Spacewatch ||  || align=right | 1.7 km || 
|-id=203 bgcolor=#d6d6d6
| 592203 ||  || — || August 30, 2003 || Kitt Peak || Spacewatch ||  || align=right | 2.6 km || 
|-id=204 bgcolor=#fefefe
| 592204 ||  || — || July 31, 2014 || Haleakala || Pan-STARRS ||  || align=right data-sort-value="0.70" | 700 m || 
|-id=205 bgcolor=#d6d6d6
| 592205 ||  || — || July 1, 2014 || Haleakala || Pan-STARRS ||  || align=right | 2.7 km || 
|-id=206 bgcolor=#d6d6d6
| 592206 ||  || — || April 13, 2013 || Haleakala || Pan-STARRS ||  || align=right | 2.7 km || 
|-id=207 bgcolor=#d6d6d6
| 592207 ||  || — || June 29, 2014 || Haleakala || Pan-STARRS ||  || align=right | 2.6 km || 
|-id=208 bgcolor=#fefefe
| 592208 ||  || — || June 27, 2014 || Haleakala || Pan-STARRS ||  || align=right data-sort-value="0.74" | 740 m || 
|-id=209 bgcolor=#fefefe
| 592209 ||  || — || December 6, 2008 || Kitt Peak || Spacewatch ||  || align=right data-sort-value="0.57" | 570 m || 
|-id=210 bgcolor=#fefefe
| 592210 ||  || — || December 18, 2004 || Mount Lemmon || Mount Lemmon Survey ||  || align=right data-sort-value="0.57" | 570 m || 
|-id=211 bgcolor=#fefefe
| 592211 ||  || — || November 25, 2005 || Mount Lemmon || Mount Lemmon Survey ||  || align=right data-sort-value="0.75" | 750 m || 
|-id=212 bgcolor=#fefefe
| 592212 ||  || — || March 18, 2013 || Mount Lemmon || Mount Lemmon Survey ||  || align=right data-sort-value="0.53" | 530 m || 
|-id=213 bgcolor=#fefefe
| 592213 ||  || — || August 22, 2014 || Haleakala || Pan-STARRS ||  || align=right data-sort-value="0.55" | 550 m || 
|-id=214 bgcolor=#d6d6d6
| 592214 ||  || — || December 30, 2005 || Kitt Peak || Spacewatch ||  || align=right | 2.9 km || 
|-id=215 bgcolor=#E9E9E9
| 592215 ||  || — || October 11, 2010 || Mount Lemmon || Mount Lemmon Survey ||  || align=right | 1.1 km || 
|-id=216 bgcolor=#fefefe
| 592216 ||  || — || July 26, 2014 || Haleakala || Pan-STARRS ||  || align=right data-sort-value="0.51" | 510 m || 
|-id=217 bgcolor=#fefefe
| 592217 ||  || — || February 11, 2013 || Catalina || CSS ||  || align=right data-sort-value="0.73" | 730 m || 
|-id=218 bgcolor=#E9E9E9
| 592218 ||  || — || August 22, 2014 || Haleakala || Pan-STARRS ||  || align=right | 1.1 km || 
|-id=219 bgcolor=#fefefe
| 592219 ||  || — || June 23, 2014 || Mount Lemmon || Mount Lemmon Survey ||  || align=right data-sort-value="0.57" | 570 m || 
|-id=220 bgcolor=#d6d6d6
| 592220 ||  || — || August 20, 2014 || Haleakala || Pan-STARRS || KOR || align=right | 1.1 km || 
|-id=221 bgcolor=#fefefe
| 592221 ||  || — || August 22, 2014 || Haleakala || Pan-STARRS ||  || align=right data-sort-value="0.67" | 670 m || 
|-id=222 bgcolor=#d6d6d6
| 592222 ||  || — || August 22, 2014 || Haleakala || Pan-STARRS ||  || align=right | 2.0 km || 
|-id=223 bgcolor=#fefefe
| 592223 ||  || — || October 15, 2004 || Mount Lemmon || Mount Lemmon Survey ||  || align=right data-sort-value="0.80" | 800 m || 
|-id=224 bgcolor=#fefefe
| 592224 ||  || — || December 2, 2005 || Mauna Kea || Mauna Kea Obs. ||  || align=right data-sort-value="0.74" | 740 m || 
|-id=225 bgcolor=#d6d6d6
| 592225 ||  || — || September 19, 1998 || Apache Point || SDSS Collaboration ||  || align=right | 2.8 km || 
|-id=226 bgcolor=#d6d6d6
| 592226 ||  || — || March 31, 2003 || Kitt Peak || Spacewatch ||  || align=right | 2.4 km || 
|-id=227 bgcolor=#fefefe
| 592227 ||  || — || October 7, 2005 || Mauna Kea || Mauna Kea Obs. ||  || align=right data-sort-value="0.55" | 550 m || 
|-id=228 bgcolor=#d6d6d6
| 592228 ||  || — || April 15, 2013 || Haleakala || Pan-STARRS ||  || align=right | 3.1 km || 
|-id=229 bgcolor=#fefefe
| 592229 ||  || — || February 22, 2006 || Mount Lemmon || Mount Lemmon Survey ||  || align=right data-sort-value="0.86" | 860 m || 
|-id=230 bgcolor=#d6d6d6
| 592230 ||  || — || September 30, 2003 || Kitt Peak || Spacewatch ||  || align=right | 2.3 km || 
|-id=231 bgcolor=#fefefe
| 592231 ||  || — || May 7, 2010 || Mount Lemmon || Mount Lemmon Survey ||  || align=right data-sort-value="0.64" | 640 m || 
|-id=232 bgcolor=#FA8072
| 592232 ||  || — || March 27, 2003 || Kitt Peak || Spacewatch ||  || align=right data-sort-value="0.67" | 670 m || 
|-id=233 bgcolor=#E9E9E9
| 592233 ||  || — || January 31, 2008 || Mount Lemmon || Mount Lemmon Survey ||  || align=right | 2.9 km || 
|-id=234 bgcolor=#d6d6d6
| 592234 ||  || — || November 2, 2004 || Anderson Mesa || LONEOS ||  || align=right | 3.5 km || 
|-id=235 bgcolor=#fefefe
| 592235 ||  || — || August 26, 2014 || Haleakala || Pan-STARRS ||  || align=right data-sort-value="0.67" | 670 m || 
|-id=236 bgcolor=#E9E9E9
| 592236 ||  || — || April 21, 2009 || Kitt Peak || Spacewatch ||  || align=right | 1.2 km || 
|-id=237 bgcolor=#fefefe
| 592237 ||  || — || July 7, 2014 || Haleakala || Pan-STARRS ||  || align=right data-sort-value="0.57" | 570 m || 
|-id=238 bgcolor=#fefefe
| 592238 ||  || — || April 20, 2010 || Kitt Peak || Spacewatch ||  || align=right data-sort-value="0.57" | 570 m || 
|-id=239 bgcolor=#fefefe
| 592239 ||  || — || March 25, 2006 || Palomar || NEAT ||  || align=right data-sort-value="0.97" | 970 m || 
|-id=240 bgcolor=#fefefe
| 592240 ||  || — || January 2, 2012 || Mount Lemmon || Mount Lemmon Survey ||  || align=right data-sort-value="0.56" | 560 m || 
|-id=241 bgcolor=#fefefe
| 592241 ||  || — || October 7, 2005 || Mauna Kea || Mauna Kea Obs. ||  || align=right data-sort-value="0.89" | 890 m || 
|-id=242 bgcolor=#fefefe
| 592242 ||  || — || October 20, 2011 || Mount Lemmon || Mount Lemmon Survey ||  || align=right data-sort-value="0.63" | 630 m || 
|-id=243 bgcolor=#E9E9E9
| 592243 ||  || — || September 18, 2010 || Mount Lemmon || Mount Lemmon Survey ||  || align=right | 1.4 km || 
|-id=244 bgcolor=#fefefe
| 592244 Daukantas ||  ||  || May 6, 2013 || Baldone || I. Eglītis ||  || align=right data-sort-value="0.74" | 740 m || 
|-id=245 bgcolor=#C2E0FF
| 592245 ||  || — || August 18, 2014 || Cerro Tololo-DECam || S. Kent, R. Kron || SDOcritical || align=right | 188 km || 
|-id=246 bgcolor=#E9E9E9
| 592246 ||  || — || October 1, 2005 || Mount Lemmon || Mount Lemmon Survey ||  || align=right | 2.0 km || 
|-id=247 bgcolor=#fefefe
| 592247 ||  || — || January 1, 2012 || Mount Lemmon || Mount Lemmon Survey ||  || align=right data-sort-value="0.74" | 740 m || 
|-id=248 bgcolor=#fefefe
| 592248 ||  || — || March 15, 2013 || Kitt Peak || Spacewatch ||  || align=right data-sort-value="0.56" | 560 m || 
|-id=249 bgcolor=#E9E9E9
| 592249 ||  || — || November 5, 2010 || Mount Lemmon || Mount Lemmon Survey ||  || align=right | 2.0 km || 
|-id=250 bgcolor=#fefefe
| 592250 ||  || — || November 10, 2004 || Kitt Peak || Spacewatch ||  || align=right data-sort-value="0.63" | 630 m || 
|-id=251 bgcolor=#fefefe
| 592251 ||  || — || June 11, 2010 || Mount Lemmon || Mount Lemmon Survey ||  || align=right data-sort-value="0.64" | 640 m || 
|-id=252 bgcolor=#E9E9E9
| 592252 ||  || — || April 12, 2004 || Kitt Peak || Spacewatch ||  || align=right | 1.7 km || 
|-id=253 bgcolor=#fefefe
| 592253 ||  || — || March 21, 2010 || Mount Lemmon || Mount Lemmon Survey ||  || align=right data-sort-value="0.76" | 760 m || 
|-id=254 bgcolor=#fefefe
| 592254 ||  || — || August 25, 2014 || Haleakala || Pan-STARRS ||  || align=right data-sort-value="0.56" | 560 m || 
|-id=255 bgcolor=#fefefe
| 592255 ||  || — || August 31, 2014 || Haleakala || Pan-STARRS ||  || align=right data-sort-value="0.56" | 560 m || 
|-id=256 bgcolor=#fefefe
| 592256 ||  || — || August 30, 2014 || Haleakala || Pan-STARRS ||  || align=right data-sort-value="0.84" | 840 m || 
|-id=257 bgcolor=#d6d6d6
| 592257 ||  || — || July 31, 2014 || Haleakala || Pan-STARRS || 7:4 || align=right | 2.9 km || 
|-id=258 bgcolor=#d6d6d6
| 592258 ||  || — || February 3, 2012 || Haleakala || Pan-STARRS ||  || align=right | 2.5 km || 
|-id=259 bgcolor=#fefefe
| 592259 ||  || — || June 24, 2014 || Haleakala || Pan-STARRS ||  || align=right data-sort-value="0.57" | 570 m || 
|-id=260 bgcolor=#d6d6d6
| 592260 ||  || — || September 16, 2003 || Kitt Peak || Spacewatch ||  || align=right | 2.1 km || 
|-id=261 bgcolor=#fefefe
| 592261 ||  || — || September 21, 2003 || Kitt Peak || Spacewatch ||  || align=right data-sort-value="0.71" | 710 m || 
|-id=262 bgcolor=#d6d6d6
| 592262 ||  || — || March 14, 2012 || Mount Lemmon || Mount Lemmon Survey ||  || align=right | 2.7 km || 
|-id=263 bgcolor=#fefefe
| 592263 ||  || — || April 6, 2013 || Mount Lemmon || Mount Lemmon Survey ||  || align=right data-sort-value="0.67" | 670 m || 
|-id=264 bgcolor=#fefefe
| 592264 ||  || — || February 9, 1999 || Kitt Peak || Spacewatch ||  || align=right data-sort-value="0.79" | 790 m || 
|-id=265 bgcolor=#fefefe
| 592265 ||  || — || September 4, 2014 || Haleakala || Pan-STARRS ||  || align=right data-sort-value="0.73" | 730 m || 
|-id=266 bgcolor=#FA8072
| 592266 ||  || — || July 25, 2014 || Haleakala || Pan-STARRS ||  || align=right data-sort-value="0.71" | 710 m || 
|-id=267 bgcolor=#fefefe
| 592267 ||  || — || September 16, 2014 || Elena Remote || A. Oreshko ||  || align=right data-sort-value="0.63" | 630 m || 
|-id=268 bgcolor=#fefefe
| 592268 ||  || — || September 12, 2007 || Mount Lemmon || Mount Lemmon Survey ||  || align=right data-sort-value="0.54" | 540 m || 
|-id=269 bgcolor=#d6d6d6
| 592269 ||  || — || May 18, 2002 || Palomar || NEAT ||  || align=right | 2.4 km || 
|-id=270 bgcolor=#d6d6d6
| 592270 ||  || — || January 14, 2002 || Kitt Peak || Spacewatch ||  || align=right | 2.2 km || 
|-id=271 bgcolor=#fefefe
| 592271 ||  || — || March 3, 2009 || Kitt Peak || Spacewatch ||  || align=right data-sort-value="0.60" | 600 m || 
|-id=272 bgcolor=#d6d6d6
| 592272 ||  || — || August 22, 2004 || Kitt Peak || Spacewatch ||  || align=right | 1.7 km || 
|-id=273 bgcolor=#d6d6d6
| 592273 ||  || — || August 20, 2014 || Haleakala || Pan-STARRS ||  || align=right | 2.1 km || 
|-id=274 bgcolor=#fefefe
| 592274 ||  || — || July 7, 2014 || Haleakala || Pan-STARRS ||  || align=right data-sort-value="0.69" | 690 m || 
|-id=275 bgcolor=#d6d6d6
| 592275 ||  || — || December 14, 2010 || Mount Lemmon || Mount Lemmon Survey ||  || align=right | 2.7 km || 
|-id=276 bgcolor=#fefefe
| 592276 ||  || — || June 22, 2007 || Kitt Peak || Spacewatch ||  || align=right data-sort-value="0.58" | 580 m || 
|-id=277 bgcolor=#fefefe
| 592277 ||  || — || March 18, 2009 || Kitt Peak || Spacewatch ||  || align=right data-sort-value="0.73" | 730 m || 
|-id=278 bgcolor=#fefefe
| 592278 ||  || — || April 12, 2013 || Haleakala || Pan-STARRS ||  || align=right data-sort-value="0.65" | 650 m || 
|-id=279 bgcolor=#fefefe
| 592279 ||  || — || November 25, 2011 || Haleakala || Pan-STARRS ||  || align=right data-sort-value="0.46" | 460 m || 
|-id=280 bgcolor=#fefefe
| 592280 ||  || — || March 24, 2009 || Mount Lemmon || Mount Lemmon Survey ||  || align=right data-sort-value="0.68" | 680 m || 
|-id=281 bgcolor=#fefefe
| 592281 ||  || — || May 2, 2006 || Mount Lemmon || Mount Lemmon Survey ||  || align=right data-sort-value="0.55" | 550 m || 
|-id=282 bgcolor=#fefefe
| 592282 ||  || — || October 19, 2011 || Mount Lemmon || Mount Lemmon Survey ||  || align=right data-sort-value="0.69" | 690 m || 
|-id=283 bgcolor=#fefefe
| 592283 ||  || — || July 30, 2014 || Haleakala || Pan-STARRS ||  || align=right data-sort-value="0.51" | 510 m || 
|-id=284 bgcolor=#fefefe
| 592284 ||  || — || September 18, 2014 || Haleakala || Pan-STARRS ||  || align=right data-sort-value="0.53" | 530 m || 
|-id=285 bgcolor=#fefefe
| 592285 ||  || — || March 8, 2013 || Haleakala || Pan-STARRS ||  || align=right data-sort-value="0.53" | 530 m || 
|-id=286 bgcolor=#E9E9E9
| 592286 ||  || — || October 5, 2005 || Kitt Peak || Spacewatch ||  || align=right | 1.6 km || 
|-id=287 bgcolor=#fefefe
| 592287 ||  || — || September 28, 2003 || Kitt Peak || Spacewatch ||  || align=right data-sort-value="0.59" | 590 m || 
|-id=288 bgcolor=#d6d6d6
| 592288 ||  || — || August 27, 2014 || Haleakala || Pan-STARRS ||  || align=right | 1.7 km || 
|-id=289 bgcolor=#FA8072
| 592289 ||  || — || September 8, 2007 || Mount Lemmon || Mount Lemmon Survey ||  || align=right data-sort-value="0.30" | 300 m || 
|-id=290 bgcolor=#fefefe
| 592290 ||  || — || January 20, 2009 || Mount Lemmon || Mount Lemmon Survey ||  || align=right data-sort-value="0.84" | 840 m || 
|-id=291 bgcolor=#fefefe
| 592291 ||  || — || March 5, 2006 || Kitt Peak || Spacewatch ||  || align=right data-sort-value="0.91" | 910 m || 
|-id=292 bgcolor=#fefefe
| 592292 ||  || — || March 12, 2013 || Mount Lemmon || Mount Lemmon Survey ||  || align=right data-sort-value="0.55" | 550 m || 
|-id=293 bgcolor=#fefefe
| 592293 ||  || — || September 18, 2007 || Kitt Peak || Spacewatch ||  || align=right data-sort-value="0.60" | 600 m || 
|-id=294 bgcolor=#fefefe
| 592294 ||  || — || October 15, 2004 || Mount Lemmon || Mount Lemmon Survey ||  || align=right data-sort-value="0.59" | 590 m || 
|-id=295 bgcolor=#E9E9E9
| 592295 ||  || — || October 30, 2005 || Kitt Peak || Spacewatch ||  || align=right | 1.9 km || 
|-id=296 bgcolor=#fefefe
| 592296 ||  || — || January 25, 2009 || Kitt Peak || Spacewatch ||  || align=right data-sort-value="0.54" | 540 m || 
|-id=297 bgcolor=#fefefe
| 592297 ||  || — || December 16, 2004 || Kitt Peak || Spacewatch ||  || align=right | 1.0 km || 
|-id=298 bgcolor=#fefefe
| 592298 ||  || — || November 27, 2011 || Mount Lemmon || Mount Lemmon Survey ||  || align=right data-sort-value="0.70" | 700 m || 
|-id=299 bgcolor=#fefefe
| 592299 ||  || — || September 19, 2014 || Haleakala || Pan-STARRS ||  || align=right data-sort-value="0.59" | 590 m || 
|-id=300 bgcolor=#fefefe
| 592300 ||  || — || May 2, 2003 || Kitt Peak || Spacewatch ||  || align=right data-sort-value="0.74" | 740 m || 
|}

592301–592400 

|-bgcolor=#d6d6d6
| 592301 ||  || — || September 27, 2009 || Kitt Peak || Spacewatch ||  || align=right | 3.2 km || 
|-id=302 bgcolor=#d6d6d6
| 592302 ||  || — || September 30, 2003 || Kitt Peak || Spacewatch ||  || align=right | 3.2 km || 
|-id=303 bgcolor=#fefefe
| 592303 ||  || — || October 20, 2011 || Mount Lemmon || Mount Lemmon Survey ||  || align=right data-sort-value="0.67" | 670 m || 
|-id=304 bgcolor=#d6d6d6
| 592304 ||  || — || September 22, 2009 || Mount Lemmon || Mount Lemmon Survey ||  || align=right | 2.7 km || 
|-id=305 bgcolor=#fefefe
| 592305 ||  || — || August 20, 2014 || Haleakala || Pan-STARRS ||  || align=right data-sort-value="0.64" | 640 m || 
|-id=306 bgcolor=#fefefe
| 592306 ||  || — || April 17, 2013 || Haleakala || Pan-STARRS ||  || align=right data-sort-value="0.78" | 780 m || 
|-id=307 bgcolor=#d6d6d6
| 592307 ||  || — || August 27, 2014 || Haleakala || Pan-STARRS || 7:4 || align=right | 2.8 km || 
|-id=308 bgcolor=#fefefe
| 592308 ||  || — || April 9, 2010 || Kitt Peak || Spacewatch ||  || align=right data-sort-value="0.67" | 670 m || 
|-id=309 bgcolor=#d6d6d6
| 592309 ||  || — || October 27, 2009 || Kitt Peak || Spacewatch ||  || align=right | 2.6 km || 
|-id=310 bgcolor=#d6d6d6
| 592310 ||  || — || November 7, 2005 || Mauna Kea || Mauna Kea Obs. ||  || align=right | 2.5 km || 
|-id=311 bgcolor=#fefefe
| 592311 ||  || — || October 10, 2007 || Mount Lemmon || Mount Lemmon Survey ||  || align=right data-sort-value="0.63" | 630 m || 
|-id=312 bgcolor=#d6d6d6
| 592312 ||  || — || November 9, 2009 || Kitt Peak || Spacewatch ||  || align=right | 1.8 km || 
|-id=313 bgcolor=#fefefe
| 592313 ||  || — || September 13, 2007 || Mount Lemmon || Mount Lemmon Survey ||  || align=right data-sort-value="0.60" | 600 m || 
|-id=314 bgcolor=#fefefe
| 592314 ||  || — || December 29, 2011 || Mount Lemmon || Mount Lemmon Survey ||  || align=right data-sort-value="0.59" | 590 m || 
|-id=315 bgcolor=#fefefe
| 592315 ||  || — || September 14, 2014 || Mount Lemmon || Mount Lemmon Survey ||  || align=right data-sort-value="0.66" | 660 m || 
|-id=316 bgcolor=#fefefe
| 592316 ||  || — || September 26, 2014 || Kitt Peak || Spacewatch ||  || align=right data-sort-value="0.66" | 660 m || 
|-id=317 bgcolor=#fefefe
| 592317 ||  || — || October 15, 2007 || 7300 || W. K. Y. Yeung ||  || align=right data-sort-value="0.58" | 580 m || 
|-id=318 bgcolor=#d6d6d6
| 592318 ||  || — || September 17, 2009 || Kitt Peak || Spacewatch ||  || align=right | 2.4 km || 
|-id=319 bgcolor=#d6d6d6
| 592319 ||  || — || September 22, 2003 || Kitt Peak || Spacewatch ||  || align=right | 1.9 km || 
|-id=320 bgcolor=#fefefe
| 592320 ||  || — || October 15, 2007 || Mount Lemmon || Mount Lemmon Survey ||  || align=right data-sort-value="0.50" | 500 m || 
|-id=321 bgcolor=#fefefe
| 592321 ||  || — || April 17, 2013 || Haleakala || Pan-STARRS ||  || align=right data-sort-value="0.68" | 680 m || 
|-id=322 bgcolor=#fefefe
| 592322 ||  || — || October 7, 2007 || Catalina || CSS ||  || align=right data-sort-value="0.79" | 790 m || 
|-id=323 bgcolor=#fefefe
| 592323 ||  || — || May 29, 2003 || Kitt Peak || Spacewatch ||  || align=right data-sort-value="0.92" | 920 m || 
|-id=324 bgcolor=#d6d6d6
| 592324 ||  || — || April 23, 2007 || Mount Lemmon || Mount Lemmon Survey ||  || align=right | 3.2 km || 
|-id=325 bgcolor=#E9E9E9
| 592325 ||  || — || September 19, 2014 || Haleakala || Pan-STARRS ||  || align=right | 1.7 km || 
|-id=326 bgcolor=#fefefe
| 592326 ||  || — || September 18, 2014 || Haleakala || Pan-STARRS ||  || align=right data-sort-value="0.56" | 560 m || 
|-id=327 bgcolor=#fefefe
| 592327 ||  || — || September 14, 2007 || Kitt Peak || Spacewatch ||  || align=right data-sort-value="0.62" | 620 m || 
|-id=328 bgcolor=#fefefe
| 592328 ||  || — || May 6, 2006 || Kitt Peak || Spacewatch ||  || align=right data-sort-value="0.74" | 740 m || 
|-id=329 bgcolor=#fefefe
| 592329 ||  || — || October 4, 2007 || Kitt Peak || Spacewatch ||  || align=right data-sort-value="0.74" | 740 m || 
|-id=330 bgcolor=#d6d6d6
| 592330 ||  || — || September 16, 2003 || Kitt Peak || Spacewatch ||  || align=right | 2.2 km || 
|-id=331 bgcolor=#fefefe
| 592331 ||  || — || October 1, 2014 || Haleakala || Pan-STARRS ||  || align=right data-sort-value="0.86" | 860 m || 
|-id=332 bgcolor=#fefefe
| 592332 ||  || — || October 13, 2007 || Catalina || CSS ||  || align=right data-sort-value="0.62" | 620 m || 
|-id=333 bgcolor=#fefefe
| 592333 ||  || — || March 12, 2005 || Kitt Peak || M. W. Buie, L. H. Wasserman ||  || align=right data-sort-value="0.50" | 500 m || 
|-id=334 bgcolor=#d6d6d6
| 592334 ||  || — || September 21, 2003 || Kitt Peak || Spacewatch ||  || align=right | 2.2 km || 
|-id=335 bgcolor=#E9E9E9
| 592335 ||  || — || April 14, 2008 || Mount Lemmon || Mount Lemmon Survey ||  || align=right | 1.8 km || 
|-id=336 bgcolor=#FA8072
| 592336 ||  || — || May 4, 2006 || Mount Lemmon || Mount Lemmon Survey ||  || align=right data-sort-value="0.44" | 440 m || 
|-id=337 bgcolor=#fefefe
| 592337 ||  || — || September 22, 2003 || Anderson Mesa || LONEOS ||  || align=right data-sort-value="0.84" | 840 m || 
|-id=338 bgcolor=#fefefe
| 592338 ||  || — || October 1, 2014 || Haleakala || Pan-STARRS ||  || align=right data-sort-value="0.70" | 700 m || 
|-id=339 bgcolor=#d6d6d6
| 592339 ||  || — || June 30, 2014 || Haleakala || Pan-STARRS ||  || align=right | 2.1 km || 
|-id=340 bgcolor=#fefefe
| 592340 ||  || — || February 19, 2001 || Kitt Peak || Spacewatch ||  || align=right data-sort-value="0.66" | 660 m || 
|-id=341 bgcolor=#fefefe
| 592341 ||  || — || January 2, 2012 || Kitt Peak || Spacewatch ||  || align=right data-sort-value="0.63" | 630 m || 
|-id=342 bgcolor=#fefefe
| 592342 ||  || — || September 9, 2007 || Kitt Peak || Spacewatch ||  || align=right data-sort-value="0.77" | 770 m || 
|-id=343 bgcolor=#fefefe
| 592343 ||  || — || November 2, 2007 || Kitt Peak || Spacewatch ||  || align=right data-sort-value="0.69" | 690 m || 
|-id=344 bgcolor=#fefefe
| 592344 ||  || — || December 5, 2007 || Mount Lemmon || Mount Lemmon Survey ||  || align=right data-sort-value="0.56" | 560 m || 
|-id=345 bgcolor=#fefefe
| 592345 ||  || — || October 20, 2003 || Kitt Peak || Spacewatch ||  || align=right data-sort-value="0.58" | 580 m || 
|-id=346 bgcolor=#fefefe
| 592346 ||  || — || September 14, 2014 || Kitt Peak || Spacewatch ||  || align=right data-sort-value="0.69" | 690 m || 
|-id=347 bgcolor=#fefefe
| 592347 ||  || — || October 25, 2011 || Haleakala || Pan-STARRS ||  || align=right data-sort-value="0.78" | 780 m || 
|-id=348 bgcolor=#fefefe
| 592348 ||  || — || January 26, 2012 || Mount Lemmon || Mount Lemmon Survey ||  || align=right data-sort-value="0.61" | 610 m || 
|-id=349 bgcolor=#fefefe
| 592349 ||  || — || November 28, 2011 || Mount Lemmon || Mount Lemmon Survey ||  || align=right data-sort-value="0.75" | 750 m || 
|-id=350 bgcolor=#d6d6d6
| 592350 ||  || — || July 9, 2003 || Kitt Peak || Spacewatch ||  || align=right | 2.8 km || 
|-id=351 bgcolor=#d6d6d6
| 592351 ||  || — || September 18, 2003 || Kitt Peak || Spacewatch ||  || align=right | 2.4 km || 
|-id=352 bgcolor=#fefefe
| 592352 ||  || — || November 17, 2007 || Kitt Peak || Spacewatch ||  || align=right data-sort-value="0.70" | 700 m || 
|-id=353 bgcolor=#d6d6d6
| 592353 ||  || — || December 18, 2009 || Mount Lemmon || Mount Lemmon Survey ||  || align=right | 2.9 km || 
|-id=354 bgcolor=#fefefe
| 592354 ||  || — || April 21, 2009 || Bergisch Gladbach || W. Bickel ||  || align=right data-sort-value="0.88" | 880 m || 
|-id=355 bgcolor=#fefefe
| 592355 ||  || — || September 25, 2014 || Kitt Peak || Spacewatch ||  || align=right data-sort-value="0.69" | 690 m || 
|-id=356 bgcolor=#fefefe
| 592356 ||  || — || October 7, 2007 || Mount Lemmon || Mount Lemmon Survey ||  || align=right data-sort-value="0.65" | 650 m || 
|-id=357 bgcolor=#fefefe
| 592357 ||  || — || November 18, 1996 || Kitt Peak || Spacewatch ||  || align=right data-sort-value="0.71" | 710 m || 
|-id=358 bgcolor=#fefefe
| 592358 ||  || — || October 15, 2014 || Catalina || CSS || H || align=right data-sort-value="0.72" | 720 m || 
|-id=359 bgcolor=#fefefe
| 592359 ||  || — || April 24, 2009 || Mount Lemmon || Mount Lemmon Survey ||  || align=right data-sort-value="0.70" | 700 m || 
|-id=360 bgcolor=#fefefe
| 592360 ||  || — || October 23, 2014 || Mount Lemmon || Mount Lemmon Survey || H || align=right data-sort-value="0.48" | 480 m || 
|-id=361 bgcolor=#fefefe
| 592361 ||  || — || April 12, 2005 || Mount Lemmon || Mount Lemmon Survey ||  || align=right data-sort-value="0.57" | 570 m || 
|-id=362 bgcolor=#FA8072
| 592362 ||  || — || May 4, 2005 || Mauna Kea || Mauna Kea Obs. ||  || align=right data-sort-value="0.55" | 550 m || 
|-id=363 bgcolor=#fefefe
| 592363 ||  || — || March 15, 2012 || Mount Lemmon || Mount Lemmon Survey ||  || align=right data-sort-value="0.59" | 590 m || 
|-id=364 bgcolor=#d6d6d6
| 592364 ||  || — || August 15, 2013 || Haleakala || Pan-STARRS ||  || align=right | 2.4 km || 
|-id=365 bgcolor=#fefefe
| 592365 ||  || — || November 24, 2011 || Haleakala || Pan-STARRS ||  || align=right data-sort-value="0.72" | 720 m || 
|-id=366 bgcolor=#fefefe
| 592366 ||  || — || November 13, 2007 || Kitt Peak || Spacewatch ||  || align=right data-sort-value="0.51" | 510 m || 
|-id=367 bgcolor=#fefefe
| 592367 ||  || — || April 10, 2002 || Socorro || LINEAR ||  || align=right | 1.1 km || 
|-id=368 bgcolor=#fefefe
| 592368 ||  || — || August 29, 2014 || Haleakala || Pan-STARRS ||  || align=right data-sort-value="0.97" | 970 m || 
|-id=369 bgcolor=#fefefe
| 592369 ||  || — || October 19, 2003 || Apache Point || SDSS Collaboration ||  || align=right data-sort-value="0.54" | 540 m || 
|-id=370 bgcolor=#fefefe
| 592370 ||  || — || December 4, 2007 || Kitt Peak || Spacewatch ||  || align=right data-sort-value="0.66" | 660 m || 
|-id=371 bgcolor=#fefefe
| 592371 ||  || — || January 30, 2001 || Kitt Peak || Spacewatch ||  || align=right data-sort-value="0.58" | 580 m || 
|-id=372 bgcolor=#fefefe
| 592372 ||  || — || October 10, 2010 || Mount Lemmon || Mount Lemmon Survey ||  || align=right data-sort-value="0.59" | 590 m || 
|-id=373 bgcolor=#fefefe
| 592373 ||  || — || January 2, 2012 || Kitt Peak || Spacewatch ||  || align=right data-sort-value="0.60" | 600 m || 
|-id=374 bgcolor=#fefefe
| 592374 ||  || — || November 8, 2007 || Catalina || CSS ||  || align=right data-sort-value="0.74" | 740 m || 
|-id=375 bgcolor=#fefefe
| 592375 ||  || — || September 14, 2007 || Mount Lemmon || Mount Lemmon Survey ||  || align=right data-sort-value="0.88" | 880 m || 
|-id=376 bgcolor=#fefefe
| 592376 ||  || — || December 19, 2007 || Mount Lemmon || Mount Lemmon Survey ||  || align=right data-sort-value="0.76" | 760 m || 
|-id=377 bgcolor=#fefefe
| 592377 ||  || — || July 9, 2003 || Kitt Peak || Spacewatch ||  || align=right data-sort-value="0.85" | 850 m || 
|-id=378 bgcolor=#fefefe
| 592378 ||  || — || May 4, 2009 || Mount Lemmon || Mount Lemmon Survey ||  || align=right data-sort-value="0.70" | 700 m || 
|-id=379 bgcolor=#fefefe
| 592379 ||  || — || November 19, 2003 || Kitt Peak || Spacewatch || MAS || align=right data-sort-value="0.64" | 640 m || 
|-id=380 bgcolor=#E9E9E9
| 592380 ||  || — || October 29, 2010 || Mount Lemmon || Mount Lemmon Survey ||  || align=right data-sort-value="0.93" | 930 m || 
|-id=381 bgcolor=#fefefe
| 592381 ||  || — || December 19, 2003 || Kitt Peak || Spacewatch || NYS || align=right data-sort-value="0.47" | 470 m || 
|-id=382 bgcolor=#fefefe
| 592382 ||  || — || April 10, 2013 || Haleakala || Pan-STARRS ||  || align=right data-sort-value="0.76" | 760 m || 
|-id=383 bgcolor=#fefefe
| 592383 ||  || — || May 1, 2006 || Kitt Peak || Spacewatch ||  || align=right data-sort-value="0.83" | 830 m || 
|-id=384 bgcolor=#fefefe
| 592384 ||  || — || October 10, 2007 || Mount Lemmon || Mount Lemmon Survey ||  || align=right data-sort-value="0.63" | 630 m || 
|-id=385 bgcolor=#fefefe
| 592385 ||  || — || September 29, 2003 || Kitt Peak || Spacewatch ||  || align=right data-sort-value="0.73" | 730 m || 
|-id=386 bgcolor=#fefefe
| 592386 ||  || — || October 10, 2007 || Mount Lemmon || Mount Lemmon Survey ||  || align=right data-sort-value="0.94" | 940 m || 
|-id=387 bgcolor=#fefefe
| 592387 ||  || — || November 19, 2007 || Kitt Peak || Spacewatch ||  || align=right data-sort-value="0.78" | 780 m || 
|-id=388 bgcolor=#FA8072
| 592388 ||  || — || October 14, 2001 || Anderson Mesa || LONEOS ||  || align=right | 1.8 km || 
|-id=389 bgcolor=#d6d6d6
| 592389 ||  || — || October 23, 2004 || Kitt Peak || Spacewatch ||  || align=right | 2.4 km || 
|-id=390 bgcolor=#fefefe
| 592390 ||  || — || May 11, 2010 || Mount Lemmon || Mount Lemmon Survey ||  || align=right data-sort-value="0.81" | 810 m || 
|-id=391 bgcolor=#fefefe
| 592391 ||  || — || February 2, 2008 || Catalina || CSS ||  || align=right | 1.2 km || 
|-id=392 bgcolor=#d6d6d6
| 592392 ||  || — || October 29, 2014 || Haleakala || Pan-STARRS ||  || align=right | 1.9 km || 
|-id=393 bgcolor=#E9E9E9
| 592393 ||  || — || October 20, 2014 || Mount Lemmon || Mount Lemmon Survey ||  || align=right data-sort-value="0.91" | 910 m || 
|-id=394 bgcolor=#fefefe
| 592394 ||  || — || November 24, 2011 || Mount Lemmon || Mount Lemmon Survey ||  || align=right data-sort-value="0.76" | 760 m || 
|-id=395 bgcolor=#fefefe
| 592395 ||  || — || January 22, 2012 || Haleakala || Pan-STARRS ||  || align=right data-sort-value="0.88" | 880 m || 
|-id=396 bgcolor=#d6d6d6
| 592396 ||  || — || March 25, 2001 || Kitt Peak || M. W. Buie, S. D. Kern ||  || align=right | 1.9 km || 
|-id=397 bgcolor=#fefefe
| 592397 ||  || — || March 2, 2012 || Mount Lemmon || Mount Lemmon Survey ||  || align=right data-sort-value="0.59" | 590 m || 
|-id=398 bgcolor=#fefefe
| 592398 ||  || — || March 31, 2001 || Kitt Peak || Spacewatch ||  || align=right data-sort-value="0.65" | 650 m || 
|-id=399 bgcolor=#fefefe
| 592399 ||  || — || November 4, 2014 || Mount Lemmon || Mount Lemmon Survey ||  || align=right data-sort-value="0.67" | 670 m || 
|-id=400 bgcolor=#fefefe
| 592400 ||  || — || October 24, 2014 || Kitt Peak || Spacewatch ||  || align=right data-sort-value="0.52" | 520 m || 
|}

592401–592500 

|-bgcolor=#fefefe
| 592401 ||  || — || December 18, 2007 || Mount Lemmon || Mount Lemmon Survey ||  || align=right data-sort-value="0.49" | 490 m || 
|-id=402 bgcolor=#fefefe
| 592402 ||  || — || September 18, 2003 || Palomar || NEAT ||  || align=right data-sort-value="0.84" | 840 m || 
|-id=403 bgcolor=#fefefe
| 592403 ||  || — || February 9, 2008 || Kitt Peak || Spacewatch ||  || align=right data-sort-value="0.64" | 640 m || 
|-id=404 bgcolor=#fefefe
| 592404 ||  || — || October 22, 2014 || Mount Lemmon || Mount Lemmon Survey ||  || align=right data-sort-value="0.57" | 570 m || 
|-id=405 bgcolor=#d6d6d6
| 592405 ||  || — || March 30, 2012 || Mount Lemmon || Mount Lemmon Survey ||  || align=right | 2.5 km || 
|-id=406 bgcolor=#fefefe
| 592406 ||  || — || September 20, 2014 || Haleakala || Pan-STARRS ||  || align=right data-sort-value="0.76" | 760 m || 
|-id=407 bgcolor=#E9E9E9
| 592407 ||  || — || November 17, 2014 || Haleakala || Pan-STARRS ||  || align=right data-sort-value="0.77" | 770 m || 
|-id=408 bgcolor=#fefefe
| 592408 ||  || — || October 23, 2003 || Kitt Peak || Spacewatch ||  || align=right data-sort-value="0.68" | 680 m || 
|-id=409 bgcolor=#fefefe
| 592409 ||  || — || October 3, 2014 || Mount Lemmon || Mount Lemmon Survey ||  || align=right data-sort-value="0.57" | 570 m || 
|-id=410 bgcolor=#fefefe
| 592410 ||  || — || February 12, 2004 || Kitt Peak || Spacewatch ||  || align=right data-sort-value="0.90" | 900 m || 
|-id=411 bgcolor=#fefefe
| 592411 ||  || — || December 6, 2007 || Mount Lemmon || Mount Lemmon Survey ||  || align=right data-sort-value="0.63" | 630 m || 
|-id=412 bgcolor=#d6d6d6
| 592412 ||  || — || November 17, 2014 || Mount Lemmon || Mount Lemmon Survey ||  || align=right | 2.6 km || 
|-id=413 bgcolor=#E9E9E9
| 592413 ||  || — || April 29, 2003 || Apache Point || SDSS Collaboration ||  || align=right | 1.2 km || 
|-id=414 bgcolor=#fefefe
| 592414 ||  || — || September 24, 2014 || Mount Lemmon || Mount Lemmon Survey ||  || align=right data-sort-value="0.68" | 680 m || 
|-id=415 bgcolor=#fefefe
| 592415 ||  || — || June 20, 2010 || Mount Lemmon || Mount Lemmon Survey ||  || align=right data-sort-value="0.71" | 710 m || 
|-id=416 bgcolor=#fefefe
| 592416 ||  || — || April 15, 2013 || Haleakala || Pan-STARRS ||  || align=right data-sort-value="0.67" | 670 m || 
|-id=417 bgcolor=#fefefe
| 592417 ||  || — || June 4, 2013 || Kitt Peak || Spacewatch ||  || align=right data-sort-value="0.64" | 640 m || 
|-id=418 bgcolor=#fefefe
| 592418 ||  || — || March 14, 2012 || Mount Lemmon || Mount Lemmon Survey ||  || align=right data-sort-value="0.85" | 850 m || 
|-id=419 bgcolor=#fefefe
| 592419 ||  || — || December 19, 2007 || Mount Lemmon || Mount Lemmon Survey ||  || align=right data-sort-value="0.83" | 830 m || 
|-id=420 bgcolor=#fefefe
| 592420 ||  || — || February 27, 2004 || Kitt Peak || M. W. Buie, D. E. Trilling ||  || align=right data-sort-value="0.68" | 680 m || 
|-id=421 bgcolor=#fefefe
| 592421 ||  || — || October 31, 2014 || Mount Lemmon || Mount Lemmon Survey ||  || align=right data-sort-value="0.60" | 600 m || 
|-id=422 bgcolor=#fefefe
| 592422 ||  || — || April 16, 2009 || Kitt Peak || Spacewatch ||  || align=right data-sort-value="0.70" | 700 m || 
|-id=423 bgcolor=#fefefe
| 592423 ||  || — || September 28, 2003 || Kitt Peak || Spacewatch ||  || align=right data-sort-value="0.51" | 510 m || 
|-id=424 bgcolor=#fefefe
| 592424 ||  || — || October 20, 2007 || Mount Lemmon || Mount Lemmon Survey ||  || align=right data-sort-value="0.55" | 550 m || 
|-id=425 bgcolor=#fefefe
| 592425 ||  || — || December 31, 2007 || Kitt Peak || Spacewatch ||  || align=right data-sort-value="0.55" | 550 m || 
|-id=426 bgcolor=#fefefe
| 592426 ||  || — || March 16, 2012 || Haleakala || Pan-STARRS ||  || align=right data-sort-value="0.65" | 650 m || 
|-id=427 bgcolor=#fefefe
| 592427 ||  || — || November 27, 2011 || Mount Lemmon || Mount Lemmon Survey ||  || align=right data-sort-value="0.81" | 810 m || 
|-id=428 bgcolor=#d6d6d6
| 592428 ||  || — || October 27, 2009 || Kitt Peak || Spacewatch ||  || align=right | 1.8 km || 
|-id=429 bgcolor=#fefefe
| 592429 ||  || — || February 26, 2004 || Kitt Peak || M. W. Buie, D. E. Trilling ||  || align=right | 1.0 km || 
|-id=430 bgcolor=#fefefe
| 592430 ||  || — || August 10, 2010 || Kitt Peak || Spacewatch ||  || align=right data-sort-value="0.66" | 660 m || 
|-id=431 bgcolor=#fefefe
| 592431 ||  || — || October 31, 2014 || Mount Lemmon || Mount Lemmon Survey ||  || align=right data-sort-value="0.69" | 690 m || 
|-id=432 bgcolor=#fefefe
| 592432 ||  || — || October 14, 2014 || Mount Lemmon || Mount Lemmon Survey ||  || align=right data-sort-value="0.66" | 660 m || 
|-id=433 bgcolor=#fefefe
| 592433 ||  || — || October 21, 2014 || Mount Lemmon || Mount Lemmon Survey ||  || align=right data-sort-value="0.73" | 730 m || 
|-id=434 bgcolor=#fefefe
| 592434 ||  || — || July 25, 2003 || Palomar || NEAT ||  || align=right data-sort-value="0.69" | 690 m || 
|-id=435 bgcolor=#d6d6d6
| 592435 ||  || — || March 6, 2011 || Mount Lemmon || Mount Lemmon Survey ||  || align=right | 2.2 km || 
|-id=436 bgcolor=#fefefe
| 592436 ||  || — || August 19, 2006 || Kitt Peak || Spacewatch ||  || align=right data-sort-value="0.74" | 740 m || 
|-id=437 bgcolor=#d6d6d6
| 592437 ||  || — || October 13, 2006 || Kitt Peak || Spacewatch || 3:2 || align=right | 4.7 km || 
|-id=438 bgcolor=#E9E9E9
| 592438 ||  || — || March 2, 2011 || Vail-Jarnac || T. Glinos ||  || align=right | 1.0 km || 
|-id=439 bgcolor=#d6d6d6
| 592439 ||  || — || March 9, 2005 || Mount Lemmon || Mount Lemmon Survey ||  || align=right | 2.2 km || 
|-id=440 bgcolor=#fefefe
| 592440 ||  || — || August 22, 2003 || Palomar || NEAT ||  || align=right data-sort-value="0.74" | 740 m || 
|-id=441 bgcolor=#fefefe
| 592441 ||  || — || July 31, 2014 || Haleakala || Pan-STARRS ||  || align=right data-sort-value="0.75" | 750 m || 
|-id=442 bgcolor=#fefefe
| 592442 ||  || — || December 25, 2011 || Kitt Peak || Spacewatch ||  || align=right data-sort-value="0.61" | 610 m || 
|-id=443 bgcolor=#fefefe
| 592443 ||  || — || February 3, 2012 || Haleakala || Pan-STARRS ||  || align=right data-sort-value="0.75" | 750 m || 
|-id=444 bgcolor=#E9E9E9
| 592444 ||  || — || May 31, 2012 || Mount Lemmon || Mount Lemmon Survey ||  || align=right | 1.0 km || 
|-id=445 bgcolor=#E9E9E9
| 592445 ||  || — || May 7, 2008 || Kitt Peak || Spacewatch ||  || align=right data-sort-value="0.74" | 740 m || 
|-id=446 bgcolor=#fefefe
| 592446 ||  || — || November 21, 2014 || Haleakala || Pan-STARRS ||  || align=right data-sort-value="0.67" | 670 m || 
|-id=447 bgcolor=#fefefe
| 592447 ||  || — || October 24, 2003 || Apache Point || SDSS Collaboration || V || align=right data-sort-value="0.57" | 570 m || 
|-id=448 bgcolor=#fefefe
| 592448 ||  || — || November 21, 2014 || Haleakala || Pan-STARRS ||  || align=right data-sort-value="0.79" | 790 m || 
|-id=449 bgcolor=#fefefe
| 592449 ||  || — || January 30, 2008 || Eskridge || G. Hug ||  || align=right data-sort-value="0.64" | 640 m || 
|-id=450 bgcolor=#fefefe
| 592450 ||  || — || August 20, 2014 || Haleakala || Pan-STARRS ||  || align=right data-sort-value="0.74" | 740 m || 
|-id=451 bgcolor=#fefefe
| 592451 ||  || — || November 22, 2014 || Mount Lemmon || Mount Lemmon Survey ||  || align=right data-sort-value="0.66" | 660 m || 
|-id=452 bgcolor=#fefefe
| 592452 ||  || — || March 13, 2008 || Kitt Peak || Spacewatch ||  || align=right data-sort-value="0.64" | 640 m || 
|-id=453 bgcolor=#fefefe
| 592453 ||  || — || December 27, 2011 || Kitt Peak || Spacewatch ||  || align=right data-sort-value="0.76" | 760 m || 
|-id=454 bgcolor=#fefefe
| 592454 ||  || — || March 9, 2005 || Mount Lemmon || Mount Lemmon Survey ||  || align=right data-sort-value="0.60" | 600 m || 
|-id=455 bgcolor=#fefefe
| 592455 ||  || — || September 5, 2003 || Siding Spring || G. J. Garradd, R. H. McNaught ||  || align=right data-sort-value="0.71" | 710 m || 
|-id=456 bgcolor=#fefefe
| 592456 ||  || — || February 14, 2012 || Haleakala || Pan-STARRS ||  || align=right data-sort-value="0.65" | 650 m || 
|-id=457 bgcolor=#fefefe
| 592457 ||  || — || October 30, 2014 || Mount Lemmon || Mount Lemmon Survey ||  || align=right data-sort-value="0.59" | 590 m || 
|-id=458 bgcolor=#fefefe
| 592458 ||  || — || November 22, 2014 || Haleakala || Pan-STARRS ||  || align=right data-sort-value="0.66" | 660 m || 
|-id=459 bgcolor=#E9E9E9
| 592459 ||  || — || March 30, 2008 || Kitt Peak || Spacewatch ||  || align=right data-sort-value="0.95" | 950 m || 
|-id=460 bgcolor=#d6d6d6
| 592460 ||  || — || October 26, 2014 || Haleakala || Pan-STARRS ||  || align=right | 2.2 km || 
|-id=461 bgcolor=#fefefe
| 592461 ||  || — || January 19, 2012 || Haleakala || Pan-STARRS ||  || align=right data-sort-value="0.71" | 710 m || 
|-id=462 bgcolor=#fefefe
| 592462 ||  || — || January 15, 2008 || Catalina || CSS ||  || align=right | 1.0 km || 
|-id=463 bgcolor=#fefefe
| 592463 ||  || — || November 11, 2007 || Mount Lemmon || Mount Lemmon Survey ||  || align=right data-sort-value="0.86" | 860 m || 
|-id=464 bgcolor=#fefefe
| 592464 ||  || — || November 11, 2007 || Mount Lemmon || Mount Lemmon Survey ||  || align=right data-sort-value="0.87" | 870 m || 
|-id=465 bgcolor=#fefefe
| 592465 ||  || — || September 10, 2010 || Kitt Peak || Spacewatch ||  || align=right data-sort-value="0.69" | 690 m || 
|-id=466 bgcolor=#fefefe
| 592466 ||  || — || October 2, 2003 || Kitt Peak || Spacewatch ||  || align=right data-sort-value="0.61" | 610 m || 
|-id=467 bgcolor=#fefefe
| 592467 ||  || — || October 11, 2010 || Mount Lemmon || Mount Lemmon Survey ||  || align=right data-sort-value="0.73" | 730 m || 
|-id=468 bgcolor=#d6d6d6
| 592468 ||  || — || March 11, 2005 || Kitt Peak || M. W. Buie, L. H. Wasserman ||  || align=right | 1.6 km || 
|-id=469 bgcolor=#fefefe
| 592469 ||  || — || March 16, 2012 || Haleakala || Pan-STARRS ||  || align=right data-sort-value="0.79" | 790 m || 
|-id=470 bgcolor=#E9E9E9
| 592470 ||  || — || December 2, 2010 || Kitt Peak || Spacewatch ||  || align=right data-sort-value="0.75" | 750 m || 
|-id=471 bgcolor=#fefefe
| 592471 ||  || — || March 27, 2008 || Mount Lemmon || Mount Lemmon Survey ||  || align=right data-sort-value="0.55" | 550 m || 
|-id=472 bgcolor=#fefefe
| 592472 ||  || — || July 23, 2006 || Mount Lemmon || Mount Lemmon Survey ||  || align=right data-sort-value="0.92" | 920 m || 
|-id=473 bgcolor=#fefefe
| 592473 ||  || — || May 11, 2006 || Mount Lemmon || Mount Lemmon Survey ||  || align=right data-sort-value="0.99" | 990 m || 
|-id=474 bgcolor=#fefefe
| 592474 ||  || — || November 22, 2014 || Haleakala || Pan-STARRS ||  || align=right data-sort-value="0.99" | 990 m || 
|-id=475 bgcolor=#E9E9E9
| 592475 ||  || — || November 26, 2014 || Haleakala || Pan-STARRS ||  || align=right | 1.2 km || 
|-id=476 bgcolor=#d6d6d6
| 592476 ||  || — || October 9, 2008 || Mount Lemmon || Mount Lemmon Survey ||  || align=right | 2.5 km || 
|-id=477 bgcolor=#fefefe
| 592477 ||  || — || February 28, 2008 || Kitt Peak || Spacewatch ||  || align=right data-sort-value="0.71" | 710 m || 
|-id=478 bgcolor=#fefefe
| 592478 ||  || — || November 11, 2007 || Mount Lemmon || Mount Lemmon Survey ||  || align=right data-sort-value="0.69" | 690 m || 
|-id=479 bgcolor=#fefefe
| 592479 ||  || — || November 17, 1999 || Kitt Peak || Spacewatch ||  || align=right data-sort-value="0.54" | 540 m || 
|-id=480 bgcolor=#fefefe
| 592480 ||  || — || November 18, 2007 || Mount Lemmon || Mount Lemmon Survey ||  || align=right data-sort-value="0.60" | 600 m || 
|-id=481 bgcolor=#fefefe
| 592481 ||  || — || July 13, 2013 || Haleakala || Pan-STARRS ||  || align=right data-sort-value="0.72" | 720 m || 
|-id=482 bgcolor=#fefefe
| 592482 ||  || — || December 14, 2003 || Kitt Peak || Spacewatch ||  || align=right data-sort-value="0.56" | 560 m || 
|-id=483 bgcolor=#fefefe
| 592483 ||  || — || October 25, 2014 || Mount Lemmon || Mount Lemmon Survey ||  || align=right data-sort-value="0.57" | 570 m || 
|-id=484 bgcolor=#fefefe
| 592484 ||  || — || August 28, 2003 || Palomar || NEAT ||  || align=right data-sort-value="0.90" | 900 m || 
|-id=485 bgcolor=#fefefe
| 592485 ||  || — || December 3, 2007 || Kitt Peak || Spacewatch ||  || align=right data-sort-value="0.63" | 630 m || 
|-id=486 bgcolor=#fefefe
| 592486 ||  || — || February 16, 2012 || Haleakala || Pan-STARRS ||  || align=right data-sort-value="0.76" | 760 m || 
|-id=487 bgcolor=#C2E0FF
| 592487 ||  || — || October 9, 2010 || Haleakala || Pan-STARRS || cubewano (hot) || align=right | 273 km || 
|-id=488 bgcolor=#fefefe
| 592488 ||  || — || November 26, 2014 || Mount Lemmon || Mount Lemmon Survey ||  || align=right | 1.0 km || 
|-id=489 bgcolor=#fefefe
| 592489 ||  || — || January 27, 2004 || Kitt Peak || Spacewatch ||  || align=right data-sort-value="0.67" | 670 m || 
|-id=490 bgcolor=#E9E9E9
| 592490 ||  || — || August 9, 2013 || Haleakala || Pan-STARRS ||  || align=right data-sort-value="0.78" | 780 m || 
|-id=491 bgcolor=#E9E9E9
| 592491 ||  || — || November 21, 2014 || Haleakala || Pan-STARRS ||  || align=right data-sort-value="0.95" | 950 m || 
|-id=492 bgcolor=#fefefe
| 592492 ||  || — || November 1, 2010 || Mount Lemmon || Mount Lemmon Survey ||  || align=right data-sort-value="0.83" | 830 m || 
|-id=493 bgcolor=#fefefe
| 592493 ||  || — || November 16, 2014 || Mount Lemmon || Mount Lemmon Survey ||  || align=right data-sort-value="0.66" | 660 m || 
|-id=494 bgcolor=#E9E9E9
| 592494 ||  || — || November 26, 2014 || Haleakala || Pan-STARRS ||  || align=right data-sort-value="0.79" | 790 m || 
|-id=495 bgcolor=#fefefe
| 592495 ||  || — || November 17, 2014 || Haleakala || Pan-STARRS ||  || align=right data-sort-value="0.59" | 590 m || 
|-id=496 bgcolor=#fefefe
| 592496 ||  || — || November 26, 2014 || Haleakala || Pan-STARRS ||  || align=right data-sort-value="0.56" | 560 m || 
|-id=497 bgcolor=#fefefe
| 592497 ||  || — || November 14, 2007 || Mount Lemmon || Mount Lemmon Survey ||  || align=right data-sort-value="0.61" | 610 m || 
|-id=498 bgcolor=#fefefe
| 592498 ||  || — || October 28, 2010 || Mount Lemmon || Mount Lemmon Survey ||  || align=right data-sort-value="0.88" | 880 m || 
|-id=499 bgcolor=#fefefe
| 592499 ||  || — || November 5, 2007 || Kitt Peak || Spacewatch ||  || align=right data-sort-value="0.63" | 630 m || 
|-id=500 bgcolor=#fefefe
| 592500 ||  || — || January 11, 2008 || Kitt Peak || Spacewatch ||  || align=right data-sort-value="0.60" | 600 m || 
|}

592501–592600 

|-bgcolor=#fefefe
| 592501 ||  || — || February 15, 2005 || La Silla || A. Boattini ||  || align=right data-sort-value="0.87" | 870 m || 
|-id=502 bgcolor=#E9E9E9
| 592502 ||  || — || February 21, 2003 || Palomar || NEAT ||  || align=right data-sort-value="0.92" | 920 m || 
|-id=503 bgcolor=#fefefe
| 592503 ||  || — || December 11, 2014 || Mount Lemmon || Mount Lemmon Survey ||  || align=right data-sort-value="0.69" | 690 m || 
|-id=504 bgcolor=#fefefe
| 592504 ||  || — || November 5, 2010 || Mount Lemmon || Mount Lemmon Survey ||  || align=right data-sort-value="0.76" | 760 m || 
|-id=505 bgcolor=#E9E9E9
| 592505 ||  || — || November 26, 2014 || Haleakala || Pan-STARRS ||  || align=right data-sort-value="0.95" | 950 m || 
|-id=506 bgcolor=#fefefe
| 592506 ||  || — || October 20, 2006 || Mount Lemmon || Mount Lemmon Survey ||  || align=right data-sort-value="0.93" | 930 m || 
|-id=507 bgcolor=#fefefe
| 592507 ||  || — || February 3, 2008 || Kitt Peak || Spacewatch ||  || align=right data-sort-value="0.78" | 780 m || 
|-id=508 bgcolor=#E9E9E9
| 592508 ||  || — || February 26, 2011 || Catalina || CSS ||  || align=right | 1.4 km || 
|-id=509 bgcolor=#E9E9E9
| 592509 ||  || — || October 7, 2004 || Kitt Peak || Spacewatch ||  || align=right | 2.5 km || 
|-id=510 bgcolor=#fefefe
| 592510 ||  || — || October 2, 2006 || Mount Lemmon || Mount Lemmon Survey ||  || align=right data-sort-value="0.58" | 580 m || 
|-id=511 bgcolor=#fefefe
| 592511 ||  || — || November 21, 2003 || Kitt Peak || Spacewatch ||  || align=right data-sort-value="0.75" | 750 m || 
|-id=512 bgcolor=#E9E9E9
| 592512 ||  || — || December 24, 2005 || Kitt Peak || Spacewatch ||  || align=right | 1.4 km || 
|-id=513 bgcolor=#E9E9E9
| 592513 ||  || — || December 26, 2014 || Haleakala || Pan-STARRS ||  || align=right data-sort-value="0.77" | 770 m || 
|-id=514 bgcolor=#fefefe
| 592514 ||  || — || February 26, 2004 || Kitt Peak || M. W. Buie, D. E. Trilling ||  || align=right data-sort-value="0.75" | 750 m || 
|-id=515 bgcolor=#E9E9E9
| 592515 ||  || — || December 21, 2014 || Haleakala || Pan-STARRS ||  || align=right | 1.4 km || 
|-id=516 bgcolor=#E9E9E9
| 592516 ||  || — || November 29, 2005 || Palomar || NEAT ||  || align=right | 1.0 km || 
|-id=517 bgcolor=#E9E9E9
| 592517 ||  || — || December 21, 2014 || Haleakala || Pan-STARRS ||  || align=right | 1.3 km || 
|-id=518 bgcolor=#fefefe
| 592518 ||  || — || September 27, 2006 || Mount Lemmon || Mount Lemmon Survey ||  || align=right data-sort-value="0.93" | 930 m || 
|-id=519 bgcolor=#E9E9E9
| 592519 ||  || — || January 11, 2015 || Haleakala || Pan-STARRS ||  || align=right data-sort-value="0.93" | 930 m || 
|-id=520 bgcolor=#E9E9E9
| 592520 ||  || — || April 8, 2002 || Kitt Peak || Spacewatch ||  || align=right | 2.4 km || 
|-id=521 bgcolor=#E9E9E9
| 592521 ||  || — || October 27, 2005 || Kitt Peak || Spacewatch ||  || align=right data-sort-value="0.97" | 970 m || 
|-id=522 bgcolor=#fefefe
| 592522 ||  || — || December 26, 2014 || Haleakala || Pan-STARRS || H || align=right data-sort-value="0.46" | 460 m || 
|-id=523 bgcolor=#C2FFFF
| 592523 ||  || — || January 12, 2015 || Haleakala || Pan-STARRS || L5 || align=right | 7.8 km || 
|-id=524 bgcolor=#d6d6d6
| 592524 ||  || — || December 30, 2008 || Mount Lemmon || Mount Lemmon Survey || 3:2 || align=right | 4.8 km || 
|-id=525 bgcolor=#d6d6d6
| 592525 ||  || — || October 29, 2008 || Mount Lemmon || Mount Lemmon Survey ||  || align=right | 2.3 km || 
|-id=526 bgcolor=#E9E9E9
| 592526 ||  || — || December 14, 2010 || Mount Lemmon || Mount Lemmon Survey ||  || align=right data-sort-value="0.59" | 590 m || 
|-id=527 bgcolor=#d6d6d6
| 592527 ||  || — || December 15, 2006 || Kitt Peak || Spacewatch || 3:2 || align=right | 4.3 km || 
|-id=528 bgcolor=#fefefe
| 592528 ||  || — || June 23, 2009 || Mount Lemmon || Mount Lemmon Survey ||  || align=right data-sort-value="0.86" | 860 m || 
|-id=529 bgcolor=#fefefe
| 592529 ||  || — || October 18, 2006 || Kitt Peak || Spacewatch ||  || align=right data-sort-value="0.49" | 490 m || 
|-id=530 bgcolor=#fefefe
| 592530 ||  || — || March 12, 2008 || Kitt Peak || Spacewatch ||  || align=right data-sort-value="0.57" | 570 m || 
|-id=531 bgcolor=#E9E9E9
| 592531 ||  || — || January 8, 2002 || Kitt Peak || Spacewatch ||  || align=right | 1.4 km || 
|-id=532 bgcolor=#fefefe
| 592532 ||  || — || September 10, 2013 || Haleakala || Pan-STARRS ||  || align=right data-sort-value="0.83" | 830 m || 
|-id=533 bgcolor=#fefefe
| 592533 ||  || — || December 2, 2010 || Mount Lemmon || Mount Lemmon Survey ||  || align=right data-sort-value="0.91" | 910 m || 
|-id=534 bgcolor=#fefefe
| 592534 ||  || — || October 11, 2010 || Catalina || CSS ||  || align=right data-sort-value="0.75" | 750 m || 
|-id=535 bgcolor=#E9E9E9
| 592535 ||  || — || February 13, 2011 || Mount Lemmon || Mount Lemmon Survey ||  || align=right | 1.1 km || 
|-id=536 bgcolor=#d6d6d6
| 592536 ||  || — || March 31, 2012 || Mount Lemmon || Mount Lemmon Survey ||  || align=right | 2.9 km || 
|-id=537 bgcolor=#E9E9E9
| 592537 ||  || — || February 13, 2011 || Mount Lemmon || Mount Lemmon Survey ||  || align=right | 1.00 km || 
|-id=538 bgcolor=#E9E9E9
| 592538 ||  || — || December 21, 2014 || Haleakala || Pan-STARRS ||  || align=right | 1.4 km || 
|-id=539 bgcolor=#E9E9E9
| 592539 ||  || — || January 12, 2011 || Mount Lemmon || Mount Lemmon Survey ||  || align=right data-sort-value="0.78" | 780 m || 
|-id=540 bgcolor=#E9E9E9
| 592540 ||  || — || February 10, 2011 || Mount Lemmon || Mount Lemmon Survey ||  || align=right | 1.1 km || 
|-id=541 bgcolor=#fefefe
| 592541 ||  || — || October 4, 2006 || Mount Lemmon || Mount Lemmon Survey ||  || align=right data-sort-value="0.58" | 580 m || 
|-id=542 bgcolor=#fefefe
| 592542 ||  || — || March 8, 2008 || Mount Lemmon || Mount Lemmon Survey ||  || align=right data-sort-value="0.81" | 810 m || 
|-id=543 bgcolor=#E9E9E9
| 592543 ||  || — || February 13, 2007 || Mount Lemmon || Mount Lemmon Survey ||  || align=right data-sort-value="0.89" | 890 m || 
|-id=544 bgcolor=#fefefe
| 592544 ||  || — || November 20, 2006 || Kitt Peak || Spacewatch ||  || align=right data-sort-value="0.86" | 860 m || 
|-id=545 bgcolor=#fefefe
| 592545 ||  || — || December 21, 2014 || Mount Lemmon || Mount Lemmon Survey ||  || align=right data-sort-value="0.67" | 670 m || 
|-id=546 bgcolor=#fefefe
| 592546 ||  || — || February 28, 2012 || Haleakala || Pan-STARRS ||  || align=right data-sort-value="0.91" | 910 m || 
|-id=547 bgcolor=#E9E9E9
| 592547 ||  || — || September 25, 2009 || Mount Lemmon || Mount Lemmon Survey ||  || align=right data-sort-value="0.71" | 710 m || 
|-id=548 bgcolor=#E9E9E9
| 592548 ||  || — || December 21, 2014 || Haleakala || Pan-STARRS ||  || align=right data-sort-value="0.70" | 700 m || 
|-id=549 bgcolor=#fefefe
| 592549 ||  || — || May 22, 2001 || Eskridge || G. Hug ||  || align=right | 1.2 km || 
|-id=550 bgcolor=#E9E9E9
| 592550 ||  || — || December 16, 2014 || Haleakala || Pan-STARRS ||  || align=right data-sort-value="0.77" | 770 m || 
|-id=551 bgcolor=#fefefe
| 592551 ||  || — || October 9, 2010 || Mount Lemmon || Mount Lemmon Survey ||  || align=right data-sort-value="0.90" | 900 m || 
|-id=552 bgcolor=#E9E9E9
| 592552 ||  || — || March 26, 2007 || Kitt Peak || Spacewatch ||  || align=right | 1.0 km || 
|-id=553 bgcolor=#E9E9E9
| 592553 ||  || — || February 13, 2011 || Kitt Peak || Spacewatch ||  || align=right data-sort-value="0.77" | 770 m || 
|-id=554 bgcolor=#E9E9E9
| 592554 ||  || — || January 15, 2015 || Haleakala || Pan-STARRS ||  || align=right data-sort-value="0.95" | 950 m || 
|-id=555 bgcolor=#E9E9E9
| 592555 ||  || — || May 13, 2007 || Mount Lemmon || Mount Lemmon Survey ||  || align=right | 1.3 km || 
|-id=556 bgcolor=#E9E9E9
| 592556 ||  || — || December 5, 2005 || Mount Lemmon || Mount Lemmon Survey ||  || align=right | 2.1 km || 
|-id=557 bgcolor=#E9E9E9
| 592557 ||  || — || November 10, 2013 || Mount Lemmon || Mount Lemmon Survey ||  || align=right | 1.7 km || 
|-id=558 bgcolor=#E9E9E9
| 592558 ||  || — || January 14, 2011 || Kitt Peak || Spacewatch ||  || align=right data-sort-value="0.78" | 780 m || 
|-id=559 bgcolor=#fefefe
| 592559 ||  || — || February 16, 2005 || La Silla || A. Boattini ||  || align=right data-sort-value="0.73" | 730 m || 
|-id=560 bgcolor=#E9E9E9
| 592560 ||  || — || March 1, 2011 || Charleston || R. Holmes ||  || align=right | 1.0 km || 
|-id=561 bgcolor=#fefefe
| 592561 ||  || — || December 21, 2014 || Haleakala || Pan-STARRS ||  || align=right data-sort-value="0.79" | 790 m || 
|-id=562 bgcolor=#E9E9E9
| 592562 ||  || — || January 27, 2007 || Mount Lemmon || Mount Lemmon Survey ||  || align=right | 1.0 km || 
|-id=563 bgcolor=#E9E9E9
| 592563 ||  || — || January 23, 2011 || Mount Lemmon || Mount Lemmon Survey ||  || align=right data-sort-value="0.80" | 800 m || 
|-id=564 bgcolor=#E9E9E9
| 592564 ||  || — || April 1, 2003 || Apache Point || SDSS Collaboration ||  || align=right | 1.7 km || 
|-id=565 bgcolor=#E9E9E9
| 592565 ||  || — || September 3, 2013 || Calar Alto || F. Hormuth ||  || align=right data-sort-value="0.71" | 710 m || 
|-id=566 bgcolor=#E9E9E9
| 592566 ||  || — || March 9, 2007 || Mount Lemmon || Mount Lemmon Survey ||  || align=right data-sort-value="0.75" | 750 m || 
|-id=567 bgcolor=#fefefe
| 592567 ||  || — || August 29, 2006 || Kitt Peak || Spacewatch ||  || align=right data-sort-value="0.63" | 630 m || 
|-id=568 bgcolor=#E9E9E9
| 592568 ||  || — || January 13, 2015 || Haleakala || Pan-STARRS ||  || align=right data-sort-value="0.80" | 800 m || 
|-id=569 bgcolor=#E9E9E9
| 592569 ||  || — || September 26, 2000 || Apache Point || SDSS Collaboration ||  || align=right | 1.1 km || 
|-id=570 bgcolor=#fefefe
| 592570 ||  || — || October 2, 2006 || Mount Lemmon || Mount Lemmon Survey ||  || align=right data-sort-value="0.75" | 750 m || 
|-id=571 bgcolor=#fefefe
| 592571 ||  || — || November 10, 2006 || Kitt Peak || Spacewatch ||  || align=right data-sort-value="0.83" | 830 m || 
|-id=572 bgcolor=#fefefe
| 592572 ||  || — || January 16, 2015 || Mount Lemmon || Mount Lemmon Survey ||  || align=right data-sort-value="0.79" | 790 m || 
|-id=573 bgcolor=#E9E9E9
| 592573 ||  || — || February 27, 2007 || Kitt Peak || Spacewatch ||  || align=right | 1.2 km || 
|-id=574 bgcolor=#fefefe
| 592574 ||  || — || December 26, 2014 || Haleakala || Pan-STARRS ||  || align=right data-sort-value="0.75" | 750 m || 
|-id=575 bgcolor=#E9E9E9
| 592575 ||  || — || July 30, 2000 || Cerro Tololo || M. W. Buie, S. D. Kern ||  || align=right data-sort-value="0.77" | 770 m || 
|-id=576 bgcolor=#E9E9E9
| 592576 ||  || — || October 3, 2013 || Mount Lemmon || Mount Lemmon Survey ||  || align=right data-sort-value="0.99" | 990 m || 
|-id=577 bgcolor=#fefefe
| 592577 ||  || — || January 12, 2000 || Kitt Peak || Spacewatch ||  || align=right data-sort-value="0.96" | 960 m || 
|-id=578 bgcolor=#E9E9E9
| 592578 ||  || — || January 27, 2007 || Kitt Peak || Spacewatch ||  || align=right | 1.0 km || 
|-id=579 bgcolor=#E9E9E9
| 592579 ||  || — || August 26, 2012 || Haleakala || Pan-STARRS ||  || align=right | 1.6 km || 
|-id=580 bgcolor=#E9E9E9
| 592580 ||  || — || March 6, 2011 || Mount Lemmon || Mount Lemmon Survey ||  || align=right data-sort-value="0.99" | 990 m || 
|-id=581 bgcolor=#E9E9E9
| 592581 ||  || — || January 16, 2015 || Haleakala || Pan-STARRS ||  || align=right | 1.1 km || 
|-id=582 bgcolor=#E9E9E9
| 592582 ||  || — || January 16, 2015 || Haleakala || Pan-STARRS ||  || align=right data-sort-value="0.98" | 980 m || 
|-id=583 bgcolor=#fefefe
| 592583 ||  || — || August 21, 2006 || Kitt Peak || Spacewatch ||  || align=right data-sort-value="0.61" | 610 m || 
|-id=584 bgcolor=#fefefe
| 592584 ||  || — || December 12, 2014 || Haleakala || Pan-STARRS ||  || align=right data-sort-value="0.73" | 730 m || 
|-id=585 bgcolor=#E9E9E9
| 592585 ||  || — || April 28, 2012 || Mount Lemmon || Mount Lemmon Survey ||  || align=right data-sort-value="0.83" | 830 m || 
|-id=586 bgcolor=#E9E9E9
| 592586 ||  || — || January 8, 2011 || Mount Lemmon || Mount Lemmon Survey ||  || align=right | 1.5 km || 
|-id=587 bgcolor=#E9E9E9
| 592587 ||  || — || January 17, 2015 || Haleakala || Pan-STARRS ||  || align=right data-sort-value="0.67" | 670 m || 
|-id=588 bgcolor=#E9E9E9
| 592588 ||  || — || October 12, 2005 || Kitt Peak || Spacewatch ||  || align=right data-sort-value="0.79" | 790 m || 
|-id=589 bgcolor=#E9E9E9
| 592589 ||  || — || July 2, 2008 || Kitt Peak || Spacewatch ||  || align=right | 1.1 km || 
|-id=590 bgcolor=#E9E9E9
| 592590 ||  || — || February 10, 2011 || Mount Lemmon || Mount Lemmon Survey ||  || align=right data-sort-value="0.75" | 750 m || 
|-id=591 bgcolor=#E9E9E9
| 592591 ||  || — || January 17, 2015 || Haleakala || Pan-STARRS ||  || align=right data-sort-value="0.67" | 670 m || 
|-id=592 bgcolor=#E9E9E9
| 592592 ||  || — || December 6, 2005 || Kitt Peak || Spacewatch ||  || align=right | 1.0 km || 
|-id=593 bgcolor=#fefefe
| 592593 ||  || — || September 25, 2006 || Kitt Peak || Spacewatch ||  || align=right data-sort-value="0.73" | 730 m || 
|-id=594 bgcolor=#E9E9E9
| 592594 ||  || — || March 14, 2011 || Mount Lemmon || Mount Lemmon Survey ||  || align=right | 1.0 km || 
|-id=595 bgcolor=#E9E9E9
| 592595 ||  || — || January 18, 2015 || Mount Lemmon || Mount Lemmon Survey ||  || align=right | 1.1 km || 
|-id=596 bgcolor=#d6d6d6
| 592596 ||  || — || November 4, 2013 || Mount Lemmon || Mount Lemmon Survey || 3:2 || align=right | 3.2 km || 
|-id=597 bgcolor=#fefefe
| 592597 ||  || — || January 16, 2015 || Mount Lemmon || Mount Lemmon Survey || H || align=right data-sort-value="0.52" | 520 m || 
|-id=598 bgcolor=#E9E9E9
| 592598 ||  || — || December 3, 2013 || Haleakala || Pan-STARRS ||  || align=right data-sort-value="0.96" | 960 m || 
|-id=599 bgcolor=#E9E9E9
| 592599 ||  || — || January 16, 2015 || Haleakala || Pan-STARRS ||  || align=right data-sort-value="0.63" | 630 m || 
|-id=600 bgcolor=#E9E9E9
| 592600 ||  || — || January 27, 2011 || Mount Lemmon || Mount Lemmon Survey ||  || align=right | 1.3 km || 
|}

592601–592700 

|-bgcolor=#E9E9E9
| 592601 ||  || — || August 23, 2004 || Kitt Peak || Spacewatch ||  || align=right data-sort-value="0.93" | 930 m || 
|-id=602 bgcolor=#E9E9E9
| 592602 ||  || — || July 18, 2012 || Catalina || CSS ||  || align=right | 1.4 km || 
|-id=603 bgcolor=#E9E9E9
| 592603 ||  || — || January 17, 2015 || Haleakala || Pan-STARRS ||  || align=right data-sort-value="0.81" | 810 m || 
|-id=604 bgcolor=#fefefe
| 592604 ||  || — || February 29, 2008 || Kitt Peak || Spacewatch ||  || align=right data-sort-value="0.78" | 780 m || 
|-id=605 bgcolor=#E9E9E9
| 592605 ||  || — || January 17, 2015 || Haleakala || Pan-STARRS ||  || align=right | 1.8 km || 
|-id=606 bgcolor=#E9E9E9
| 592606 ||  || — || March 30, 2011 || Mount Lemmon || Mount Lemmon Survey ||  || align=right | 1.0 km || 
|-id=607 bgcolor=#E9E9E9
| 592607 ||  || — || April 4, 2003 || Kitt Peak || Spacewatch ||  || align=right | 1.1 km || 
|-id=608 bgcolor=#E9E9E9
| 592608 ||  || — || April 1, 2003 || Apache Point || SDSS Collaboration ||  || align=right | 1.1 km || 
|-id=609 bgcolor=#E9E9E9
| 592609 ||  || — || March 23, 2003 || Apache Point || SDSS Collaboration ||  || align=right data-sort-value="0.87" | 870 m || 
|-id=610 bgcolor=#fefefe
| 592610 ||  || — || August 8, 2013 || Kitt Peak || Spacewatch ||  || align=right data-sort-value="0.89" | 890 m || 
|-id=611 bgcolor=#E9E9E9
| 592611 ||  || — || January 17, 2015 || Haleakala || Pan-STARRS ||  || align=right data-sort-value="0.86" | 860 m || 
|-id=612 bgcolor=#E9E9E9
| 592612 ||  || — || January 31, 2006 || Kitt Peak || Spacewatch ||  || align=right | 2.0 km || 
|-id=613 bgcolor=#E9E9E9
| 592613 ||  || — || January 17, 2015 || Haleakala || Pan-STARRS ||  || align=right data-sort-value="0.83" | 830 m || 
|-id=614 bgcolor=#E9E9E9
| 592614 ||  || — || January 17, 2015 || Haleakala || Pan-STARRS ||  || align=right | 1.0 km || 
|-id=615 bgcolor=#E9E9E9
| 592615 ||  || — || October 30, 2013 || Haleakala || Pan-STARRS ||  || align=right | 1.1 km || 
|-id=616 bgcolor=#E9E9E9
| 592616 ||  || — || September 14, 2013 || Haleakala || Pan-STARRS ||  || align=right | 1.3 km || 
|-id=617 bgcolor=#E9E9E9
| 592617 ||  || — || January 17, 2015 || Haleakala || Pan-STARRS ||  || align=right | 1.1 km || 
|-id=618 bgcolor=#E9E9E9
| 592618 ||  || — || February 6, 2002 || Kitt Peak || R. Millis, M. W. Buie ||  || align=right | 1.2 km || 
|-id=619 bgcolor=#E9E9E9
| 592619 ||  || — || December 22, 2005 || Kitt Peak || Spacewatch || ADE || align=right | 1.6 km || 
|-id=620 bgcolor=#E9E9E9
| 592620 ||  || — || January 27, 2007 || Mount Lemmon || Mount Lemmon Survey ||  || align=right | 1.1 km || 
|-id=621 bgcolor=#fefefe
| 592621 ||  || — || November 14, 2010 || Catalina || CSS ||  || align=right | 1.0 km || 
|-id=622 bgcolor=#E9E9E9
| 592622 ||  || — || September 10, 2013 || Haleakala || Pan-STARRS ||  || align=right | 1.9 km || 
|-id=623 bgcolor=#E9E9E9
| 592623 ||  || — || January 14, 2011 || Mount Lemmon || Mount Lemmon Survey ||  || align=right data-sort-value="0.73" | 730 m || 
|-id=624 bgcolor=#E9E9E9
| 592624 ||  || — || February 17, 2007 || Kitt Peak || Spacewatch ||  || align=right | 1.3 km || 
|-id=625 bgcolor=#fefefe
| 592625 ||  || — || May 12, 2012 || Mount Lemmon || Mount Lemmon Survey ||  || align=right data-sort-value="0.66" | 660 m || 
|-id=626 bgcolor=#fefefe
| 592626 ||  || — || August 15, 2013 || Haleakala || Pan-STARRS ||  || align=right data-sort-value="0.87" | 870 m || 
|-id=627 bgcolor=#E9E9E9
| 592627 ||  || — || February 1, 2011 || Bisei SG Center || A. Asami, S. Urakawa ||  || align=right data-sort-value="0.90" | 900 m || 
|-id=628 bgcolor=#E9E9E9
| 592628 ||  || — || December 21, 2014 || Haleakala || Pan-STARRS ||  || align=right data-sort-value="0.83" | 830 m || 
|-id=629 bgcolor=#E9E9E9
| 592629 ||  || — || January 18, 2015 || Haleakala || Pan-STARRS ||  || align=right data-sort-value="0.77" | 770 m || 
|-id=630 bgcolor=#d6d6d6
| 592630 ||  || — || February 29, 2008 || Mount Lemmon || Mount Lemmon Survey || 3:2 || align=right | 5.3 km || 
|-id=631 bgcolor=#E9E9E9
| 592631 ||  || — || October 26, 2013 || Mount Lemmon || Mount Lemmon Survey ||  || align=right data-sort-value="0.83" | 830 m || 
|-id=632 bgcolor=#fefefe
| 592632 ||  || — || July 14, 2013 || Haleakala || Pan-STARRS ||  || align=right data-sort-value="0.64" | 640 m || 
|-id=633 bgcolor=#E9E9E9
| 592633 ||  || — || January 28, 2011 || Kitt Peak || Spacewatch ||  || align=right data-sort-value="0.79" | 790 m || 
|-id=634 bgcolor=#E9E9E9
| 592634 ||  || — || February 12, 2011 || Mount Lemmon || Mount Lemmon Survey ||  || align=right data-sort-value="0.69" | 690 m || 
|-id=635 bgcolor=#E9E9E9
| 592635 ||  || — || June 2, 2011 || Bergisch Gladbach || W. Bickel ||  || align=right | 2.1 km || 
|-id=636 bgcolor=#E9E9E9
| 592636 ||  || — || January 28, 2007 || Mount Lemmon || Mount Lemmon Survey ||  || align=right data-sort-value="0.83" | 830 m || 
|-id=637 bgcolor=#E9E9E9
| 592637 ||  || — || November 6, 2005 || Mount Lemmon || Mount Lemmon Survey ||  || align=right | 1.4 km || 
|-id=638 bgcolor=#E9E9E9
| 592638 ||  || — || October 24, 2013 || Mount Lemmon || Mount Lemmon Survey ||  || align=right | 1.1 km || 
|-id=639 bgcolor=#E9E9E9
| 592639 ||  || — || January 30, 2011 || Haleakala || Pan-STARRS ||  || align=right | 1.2 km || 
|-id=640 bgcolor=#E9E9E9
| 592640 ||  || — || November 9, 2013 || Haleakala || Pan-STARRS ||  || align=right | 1.3 km || 
|-id=641 bgcolor=#E9E9E9
| 592641 ||  || — || May 27, 2012 || Mount Lemmon || Mount Lemmon Survey ||  || align=right data-sort-value="0.83" | 830 m || 
|-id=642 bgcolor=#E9E9E9
| 592642 ||  || — || February 25, 2011 || Catalina || CSS ||  || align=right | 1.2 km || 
|-id=643 bgcolor=#E9E9E9
| 592643 ||  || — || January 9, 2006 || Kitt Peak || Spacewatch || EUN || align=right | 1.3 km || 
|-id=644 bgcolor=#E9E9E9
| 592644 ||  || — || January 19, 2015 || Haleakala || Pan-STARRS ||  || align=right data-sort-value="0.77" | 770 m || 
|-id=645 bgcolor=#E9E9E9
| 592645 ||  || — || March 9, 2002 || Palomar || NEAT ||  || align=right | 1.8 km || 
|-id=646 bgcolor=#E9E9E9
| 592646 ||  || — || August 23, 2004 || Kitt Peak || Spacewatch ||  || align=right | 1.1 km || 
|-id=647 bgcolor=#E9E9E9
| 592647 ||  || — || March 10, 2002 || Kitt Peak || Spacewatch ||  || align=right | 1.0 km || 
|-id=648 bgcolor=#fefefe
| 592648 ||  || — || September 17, 2006 || Kitt Peak || Spacewatch ||  || align=right data-sort-value="0.73" | 730 m || 
|-id=649 bgcolor=#E9E9E9
| 592649 ||  || — || September 19, 2009 || Mount Lemmon || Mount Lemmon Survey ||  || align=right | 1.6 km || 
|-id=650 bgcolor=#E9E9E9
| 592650 ||  || — || December 26, 2014 || Haleakala || Pan-STARRS ||  || align=right | 1.3 km || 
|-id=651 bgcolor=#fefefe
| 592651 ||  || — || January 17, 2004 || Palomar || NEAT ||  || align=right data-sort-value="0.89" | 890 m || 
|-id=652 bgcolor=#fefefe
| 592652 ||  || — || January 2, 2012 || Mount Lemmon || Mount Lemmon Survey ||  || align=right data-sort-value="0.68" | 680 m || 
|-id=653 bgcolor=#E9E9E9
| 592653 ||  || — || April 6, 2011 || Mount Lemmon || Mount Lemmon Survey ||  || align=right | 1.0 km || 
|-id=654 bgcolor=#E9E9E9
| 592654 ||  || — || January 17, 2015 || Haleakala || Pan-STARRS ||  || align=right | 1.0 km || 
|-id=655 bgcolor=#fefefe
| 592655 ||  || — || September 26, 2006 || Mount Lemmon || Mount Lemmon Survey ||  || align=right data-sort-value="0.56" | 560 m || 
|-id=656 bgcolor=#E9E9E9
| 592656 ||  || — || April 15, 2007 || Kitt Peak || Spacewatch ||  || align=right | 1.4 km || 
|-id=657 bgcolor=#fefefe
| 592657 ||  || — || September 19, 1998 || Apache Point || SDSS Collaboration ||  || align=right data-sort-value="0.55" | 550 m || 
|-id=658 bgcolor=#E9E9E9
| 592658 ||  || — || October 14, 2009 || Mount Lemmon || Mount Lemmon Survey ||  || align=right | 1.2 km || 
|-id=659 bgcolor=#E9E9E9
| 592659 ||  || — || October 5, 2013 || Haleakala || Pan-STARRS ||  || align=right | 1.2 km || 
|-id=660 bgcolor=#fefefe
| 592660 ||  || — || January 2, 2011 || Mount Lemmon || Mount Lemmon Survey ||  || align=right data-sort-value="0.74" | 740 m || 
|-id=661 bgcolor=#fefefe
| 592661 ||  || — || November 30, 2003 || Kitt Peak || Spacewatch ||  || align=right data-sort-value="0.61" | 610 m || 
|-id=662 bgcolor=#fefefe
| 592662 ||  || — || August 9, 2013 || Kitt Peak || Spacewatch ||  || align=right data-sort-value="0.70" | 700 m || 
|-id=663 bgcolor=#d6d6d6
| 592663 ||  || — || December 26, 2014 || Haleakala || Pan-STARRS ||  || align=right | 2.5 km || 
|-id=664 bgcolor=#E9E9E9
| 592664 ||  || — || April 25, 2007 || Mount Lemmon || Mount Lemmon Survey ||  || align=right | 1.1 km || 
|-id=665 bgcolor=#E9E9E9
| 592665 ||  || — || January 18, 2015 || Haleakala || Pan-STARRS ||  || align=right data-sort-value="0.81" | 810 m || 
|-id=666 bgcolor=#E9E9E9
| 592666 ||  || — || November 23, 2009 || Mount Lemmon || Mount Lemmon Survey ||  || align=right | 1.1 km || 
|-id=667 bgcolor=#E9E9E9
| 592667 ||  || — || September 29, 2008 || Mount Lemmon || Mount Lemmon Survey || ADE || align=right | 1.9 km || 
|-id=668 bgcolor=#E9E9E9
| 592668 ||  || — || June 1, 2008 || Mount Lemmon || Mount Lemmon Survey ||  || align=right data-sort-value="0.84" | 840 m || 
|-id=669 bgcolor=#E9E9E9
| 592669 ||  || — || October 24, 2013 || Mount Lemmon || Mount Lemmon Survey ||  || align=right | 1.2 km || 
|-id=670 bgcolor=#E9E9E9
| 592670 ||  || — || May 30, 2012 || Mount Lemmon || Mount Lemmon Survey ||  || align=right | 1.2 km || 
|-id=671 bgcolor=#E9E9E9
| 592671 ||  || — || January 20, 2015 || Haleakala || Pan-STARRS ||  || align=right data-sort-value="0.99" | 990 m || 
|-id=672 bgcolor=#fefefe
| 592672 ||  || — || January 20, 2015 || Haleakala || Pan-STARRS ||  || align=right data-sort-value="0.67" | 670 m || 
|-id=673 bgcolor=#E9E9E9
| 592673 ||  || — || December 29, 2005 || Kitt Peak || Spacewatch ||  || align=right | 1.1 km || 
|-id=674 bgcolor=#E9E9E9
| 592674 ||  || — || October 9, 2013 || Mount Lemmon || Mount Lemmon Survey ||  || align=right data-sort-value="0.99" | 990 m || 
|-id=675 bgcolor=#E9E9E9
| 592675 ||  || — || January 11, 2011 || Mount Lemmon || Mount Lemmon Survey ||  || align=right | 1.1 km || 
|-id=676 bgcolor=#E9E9E9
| 592676 ||  || — || April 14, 2007 || Mount Lemmon || Mount Lemmon Survey ||  || align=right | 1.3 km || 
|-id=677 bgcolor=#E9E9E9
| 592677 ||  || — || February 13, 2011 || Mount Lemmon || Mount Lemmon Survey ||  || align=right data-sort-value="0.67" | 670 m || 
|-id=678 bgcolor=#E9E9E9
| 592678 ||  || — || April 2, 2011 || Kitt Peak || Spacewatch ||  || align=right | 1.2 km || 
|-id=679 bgcolor=#E9E9E9
| 592679 ||  || — || January 20, 2015 || Haleakala || Pan-STARRS ||  || align=right data-sort-value="0.74" | 740 m || 
|-id=680 bgcolor=#E9E9E9
| 592680 ||  || — || March 27, 2011 || Mount Lemmon || Mount Lemmon Survey ||  || align=right | 1.8 km || 
|-id=681 bgcolor=#E9E9E9
| 592681 ||  || — || January 20, 2015 || Haleakala || Pan-STARRS ||  || align=right data-sort-value="0.79" | 790 m || 
|-id=682 bgcolor=#E9E9E9
| 592682 ||  || — || January 20, 2015 || Haleakala || Pan-STARRS ||  || align=right | 1.0 km || 
|-id=683 bgcolor=#E9E9E9
| 592683 ||  || — || April 3, 2011 || Haleakala || Pan-STARRS ||  || align=right | 1.0 km || 
|-id=684 bgcolor=#E9E9E9
| 592684 ||  || — || March 28, 2011 || Mount Lemmon || Mount Lemmon Survey ||  || align=right | 1.0 km || 
|-id=685 bgcolor=#E9E9E9
| 592685 ||  || — || February 25, 2006 || Kitt Peak || Spacewatch || AEO || align=right data-sort-value="0.94" | 940 m || 
|-id=686 bgcolor=#E9E9E9
| 592686 ||  || — || January 20, 2015 || Haleakala || Pan-STARRS ||  || align=right | 1.3 km || 
|-id=687 bgcolor=#fefefe
| 592687 ||  || — || January 10, 2011 || Mount Lemmon || Mount Lemmon Survey ||  || align=right data-sort-value="0.64" | 640 m || 
|-id=688 bgcolor=#E9E9E9
| 592688 ||  || — || January 20, 2015 || Haleakala || Pan-STARRS ||  || align=right | 1.7 km || 
|-id=689 bgcolor=#E9E9E9
| 592689 ||  || — || January 20, 2015 || Haleakala || Pan-STARRS ||  || align=right data-sort-value="0.83" | 830 m || 
|-id=690 bgcolor=#E9E9E9
| 592690 ||  || — || December 27, 2005 || Kitt Peak || Spacewatch ||  || align=right | 1.2 km || 
|-id=691 bgcolor=#E9E9E9
| 592691 ||  || — || January 20, 2015 || Haleakala || Pan-STARRS ||  || align=right | 1.0 km || 
|-id=692 bgcolor=#E9E9E9
| 592692 ||  || — || September 6, 2008 || Mount Lemmon || Mount Lemmon Survey ||  || align=right | 1.1 km || 
|-id=693 bgcolor=#E9E9E9
| 592693 ||  || — || April 1, 2011 || Mount Lemmon || Mount Lemmon Survey ||  || align=right | 1.7 km || 
|-id=694 bgcolor=#fefefe
| 592694 ||  || — || October 26, 1995 || Kitt Peak || Spacewatch ||  || align=right data-sort-value="0.59" | 590 m || 
|-id=695 bgcolor=#E9E9E9
| 592695 ||  || — || March 6, 2011 || Kitt Peak || Spacewatch ||  || align=right | 1.8 km || 
|-id=696 bgcolor=#E9E9E9
| 592696 ||  || — || January 20, 2015 || Haleakala || Pan-STARRS ||  || align=right data-sort-value="0.60" | 600 m || 
|-id=697 bgcolor=#E9E9E9
| 592697 ||  || — || February 26, 2011 || Mount Lemmon || Mount Lemmon Survey ||  || align=right data-sort-value="0.85" | 850 m || 
|-id=698 bgcolor=#E9E9E9
| 592698 ||  || — || January 20, 2015 || Haleakala || Pan-STARRS ||  || align=right data-sort-value="0.95" | 950 m || 
|-id=699 bgcolor=#C2FFFF
| 592699 ||  || — || September 28, 2009 || Kitt Peak || Spacewatch || L4 || align=right | 7.8 km || 
|-id=700 bgcolor=#fefefe
| 592700 ||  || — || September 7, 2008 || Mount Lemmon || Mount Lemmon Survey || H || align=right data-sort-value="0.39" | 390 m || 
|}

592701–592800 

|-bgcolor=#E9E9E9
| 592701 ||  || — || September 7, 2008 || Mount Lemmon || Mount Lemmon Survey ||  || align=right | 1.0 km || 
|-id=702 bgcolor=#E9E9E9
| 592702 ||  || — || October 6, 2013 || Kitt Peak || Spacewatch ||  || align=right | 1.7 km || 
|-id=703 bgcolor=#E9E9E9
| 592703 ||  || — || April 3, 2011 || Haleakala || Pan-STARRS ||  || align=right | 1.1 km || 
|-id=704 bgcolor=#E9E9E9
| 592704 ||  || — || February 24, 2015 || Haleakala || Pan-STARRS ||  || align=right | 2.1 km || 
|-id=705 bgcolor=#E9E9E9
| 592705 ||  || — || January 18, 2015 || Haleakala || Pan-STARRS ||  || align=right data-sort-value="0.85" | 850 m || 
|-id=706 bgcolor=#E9E9E9
| 592706 ||  || — || January 20, 2015 || Haleakala || Pan-STARRS ||  || align=right | 1.2 km || 
|-id=707 bgcolor=#E9E9E9
| 592707 ||  || — || August 23, 2004 || Kitt Peak || Spacewatch ||  || align=right data-sort-value="0.98" | 980 m || 
|-id=708 bgcolor=#E9E9E9
| 592708 ||  || — || May 10, 2011 || Mount Lemmon || Mount Lemmon Survey ||  || align=right | 1.8 km || 
|-id=709 bgcolor=#E9E9E9
| 592709 ||  || — || January 24, 2007 || Mount Lemmon || Mount Lemmon Survey ||  || align=right data-sort-value="0.79" | 790 m || 
|-id=710 bgcolor=#E9E9E9
| 592710 Lenghu ||  ||  || March 29, 2011 || XuYi || PMO NEO ||  || align=right | 1.6 km || 
|-id=711 bgcolor=#E9E9E9
| 592711 ||  || — || January 20, 2015 || Haleakala || Pan-STARRS ||  || align=right data-sort-value="0.69" | 690 m || 
|-id=712 bgcolor=#E9E9E9
| 592712 ||  || — || December 4, 2005 || Mount Lemmon || Mount Lemmon Survey ||  || align=right | 1.9 km || 
|-id=713 bgcolor=#E9E9E9
| 592713 ||  || — || November 8, 2013 || Kitt Peak || Spacewatch ||  || align=right | 1.3 km || 
|-id=714 bgcolor=#fefefe
| 592714 ||  || — || January 19, 2015 || Haleakala || Pan-STARRS || H || align=right data-sort-value="0.52" | 520 m || 
|-id=715 bgcolor=#E9E9E9
| 592715 ||  || — || March 7, 2016 || Haleakala || Pan-STARRS ||  || align=right | 1.2 km || 
|-id=716 bgcolor=#E9E9E9
| 592716 ||  || — || January 22, 2015 || Haleakala || Pan-STARRS ||  || align=right | 2.2 km || 
|-id=717 bgcolor=#C2FFFF
| 592717 ||  || — || January 20, 2015 || Haleakala || Pan-STARRS || L4 || align=right | 7.0 km || 
|-id=718 bgcolor=#fefefe
| 592718 ||  || — || January 23, 2015 || Haleakala || Pan-STARRS || H || align=right data-sort-value="0.67" | 670 m || 
|-id=719 bgcolor=#E9E9E9
| 592719 ||  || — || January 28, 2015 || Haleakala || Pan-STARRS ||  || align=right | 1.1 km || 
|-id=720 bgcolor=#E9E9E9
| 592720 ||  || — || January 25, 2015 || Haleakala || Pan-STARRS ||  || align=right | 1.1 km || 
|-id=721 bgcolor=#E9E9E9
| 592721 ||  || — || January 21, 2015 || Haleakala || Pan-STARRS ||  || align=right | 1.6 km || 
|-id=722 bgcolor=#E9E9E9
| 592722 ||  || — || January 18, 2015 || Mount Lemmon || Mount Lemmon Survey ||  || align=right | 1.4 km || 
|-id=723 bgcolor=#E9E9E9
| 592723 ||  || — || January 18, 2015 || Mount Lemmon || Mount Lemmon Survey ||  || align=right data-sort-value="0.74" | 740 m || 
|-id=724 bgcolor=#E9E9E9
| 592724 ||  || — || January 22, 2015 || Haleakala || Pan-STARRS ||  || align=right | 1.5 km || 
|-id=725 bgcolor=#E9E9E9
| 592725 ||  || — || January 22, 2015 || Haleakala || Pan-STARRS ||  || align=right | 1.7 km || 
|-id=726 bgcolor=#E9E9E9
| 592726 ||  || — || February 7, 2015 || Mount Lemmon || Mount Lemmon Survey ||  || align=right | 1.3 km || 
|-id=727 bgcolor=#fefefe
| 592727 ||  || — || April 5, 2005 || Mount Lemmon || Mount Lemmon Survey ||  || align=right data-sort-value="0.71" | 710 m || 
|-id=728 bgcolor=#fefefe
| 592728 ||  || — || February 29, 2008 || Kitt Peak || Spacewatch ||  || align=right data-sort-value="0.59" | 590 m || 
|-id=729 bgcolor=#E9E9E9
| 592729 ||  || — || December 1, 2005 || Kitt Peak || Spacewatch ||  || align=right | 1.1 km || 
|-id=730 bgcolor=#d6d6d6
| 592730 ||  || — || January 7, 2005 || Catalina || CSS ||  || align=right | 3.3 km || 
|-id=731 bgcolor=#fefefe
| 592731 ||  || — || January 11, 2011 || Mount Lemmon || Mount Lemmon Survey ||  || align=right data-sort-value="0.69" | 690 m || 
|-id=732 bgcolor=#d6d6d6
| 592732 ||  || — || April 5, 2008 || Mount Lemmon || Mount Lemmon Survey || 3:2 || align=right | 3.6 km || 
|-id=733 bgcolor=#E9E9E9
| 592733 ||  || — || March 7, 2003 || Anderson Mesa || LONEOS ||  || align=right data-sort-value="0.96" | 960 m || 
|-id=734 bgcolor=#E9E9E9
| 592734 ||  || — || February 17, 2007 || Mount Lemmon || Mount Lemmon Survey ||  || align=right data-sort-value="0.74" | 740 m || 
|-id=735 bgcolor=#E9E9E9
| 592735 ||  || — || January 16, 2015 || Haleakala || Pan-STARRS ||  || align=right | 1.3 km || 
|-id=736 bgcolor=#E9E9E9
| 592736 ||  || — || March 11, 2003 || Palomar || NEAT ||  || align=right | 1.0 km || 
|-id=737 bgcolor=#E9E9E9
| 592737 ||  || — || January 18, 2015 || Kitt Peak || Spacewatch ||  || align=right | 1.4 km || 
|-id=738 bgcolor=#E9E9E9
| 592738 ||  || — || January 29, 2015 || Haleakala || Pan-STARRS ||  || align=right | 2.1 km || 
|-id=739 bgcolor=#E9E9E9
| 592739 ||  || — || January 28, 2007 || Mount Lemmon || Mount Lemmon Survey ||  || align=right | 1.0 km || 
|-id=740 bgcolor=#E9E9E9
| 592740 ||  || — || January 20, 2015 || Haleakala || Pan-STARRS ||  || align=right data-sort-value="0.69" | 690 m || 
|-id=741 bgcolor=#E9E9E9
| 592741 ||  || — || January 20, 2015 || Haleakala || Pan-STARRS ||  || align=right | 1.0 km || 
|-id=742 bgcolor=#E9E9E9
| 592742 ||  || — || January 26, 2007 || Kitt Peak || Spacewatch ||  || align=right data-sort-value="0.61" | 610 m || 
|-id=743 bgcolor=#fefefe
| 592743 ||  || — || January 22, 2015 || Catalina || CSS ||  || align=right data-sort-value="0.82" | 820 m || 
|-id=744 bgcolor=#E9E9E9
| 592744 ||  || — || September 15, 2013 || Kitt Peak || Spacewatch ||  || align=right | 1.3 km || 
|-id=745 bgcolor=#E9E9E9
| 592745 ||  || — || January 26, 2011 || Kitt Peak || Spacewatch ||  || align=right data-sort-value="0.76" | 760 m || 
|-id=746 bgcolor=#E9E9E9
| 592746 ||  || — || February 15, 2015 || Haleakala || Pan-STARRS ||  || align=right | 2.1 km || 
|-id=747 bgcolor=#E9E9E9
| 592747 ||  || — || September 7, 2008 || Mount Lemmon || Mount Lemmon Survey ||  || align=right | 1.1 km || 
|-id=748 bgcolor=#E9E9E9
| 592748 ||  || — || February 15, 2015 || Haleakala || Pan-STARRS ||  || align=right data-sort-value="0.71" | 710 m || 
|-id=749 bgcolor=#E9E9E9
| 592749 ||  || — || April 1, 2011 || Kitt Peak || Spacewatch ||  || align=right | 1.2 km || 
|-id=750 bgcolor=#fefefe
| 592750 ||  || — || August 7, 2013 || Piszkesteto || K. Sárneczky || H || align=right data-sort-value="0.62" | 620 m || 
|-id=751 bgcolor=#C2FFFF
| 592751 ||  || — || February 8, 2002 || Kitt Peak || Spacewatch || L4 || align=right | 11 km || 
|-id=752 bgcolor=#E9E9E9
| 592752 ||  || — || January 25, 2015 || Haleakala || Pan-STARRS ||  || align=right | 1.5 km || 
|-id=753 bgcolor=#fefefe
| 592753 ||  || — || February 15, 2015 || Haleakala || Pan-STARRS || H || align=right data-sort-value="0.61" | 610 m || 
|-id=754 bgcolor=#E9E9E9
| 592754 ||  || — || March 11, 2011 || Mount Lemmon || Mount Lemmon Survey ||  || align=right | 1.0 km || 
|-id=755 bgcolor=#E9E9E9
| 592755 ||  || — || February 1, 2006 || Kitt Peak || Spacewatch ||  || align=right | 1.3 km || 
|-id=756 bgcolor=#fefefe
| 592756 ||  || — || January 20, 2015 || Haleakala || Pan-STARRS || H || align=right data-sort-value="0.57" | 570 m || 
|-id=757 bgcolor=#E9E9E9
| 592757 ||  || — || December 2, 2005 || Mount Lemmon || Mount Lemmon Survey ||  || align=right | 1.1 km || 
|-id=758 bgcolor=#E9E9E9
| 592758 ||  || — || January 21, 2015 || Haleakala || Pan-STARRS ||  || align=right | 1.4 km || 
|-id=759 bgcolor=#E9E9E9
| 592759 ||  || — || March 23, 2003 || Apache Point || SDSS Collaboration ||  || align=right | 1.3 km || 
|-id=760 bgcolor=#E9E9E9
| 592760 ||  || — || February 8, 2011 || Mount Lemmon || Mount Lemmon Survey ||  || align=right data-sort-value="0.94" | 940 m || 
|-id=761 bgcolor=#E9E9E9
| 592761 ||  || — || February 13, 2015 || Mount Lemmon || Mount Lemmon Survey ||  || align=right | 1.2 km || 
|-id=762 bgcolor=#E9E9E9
| 592762 ||  || — || February 9, 2015 || Mount Lemmon || Mount Lemmon Survey ||  || align=right | 1.3 km || 
|-id=763 bgcolor=#E9E9E9
| 592763 ||  || — || November 26, 2014 || Haleakala || Pan-STARRS ||  || align=right data-sort-value="0.99" | 990 m || 
|-id=764 bgcolor=#fefefe
| 592764 ||  || — || September 27, 2006 || Vail-Jarnac || Jarnac Obs. ||  || align=right data-sort-value="0.59" | 590 m || 
|-id=765 bgcolor=#E9E9E9
| 592765 ||  || — || December 5, 2005 || Mount Lemmon || Mount Lemmon Survey ||  || align=right | 1.4 km || 
|-id=766 bgcolor=#E9E9E9
| 592766 ||  || — || May 22, 2003 || Kitt Peak || Spacewatch ||  || align=right | 1.4 km || 
|-id=767 bgcolor=#E9E9E9
| 592767 ||  || — || January 22, 2015 || Haleakala || Pan-STARRS ||  || align=right data-sort-value="0.74" | 740 m || 
|-id=768 bgcolor=#E9E9E9
| 592768 ||  || — || August 8, 2004 || Socorro || LINEAR ||  || align=right | 1.4 km || 
|-id=769 bgcolor=#E9E9E9
| 592769 ||  || — || April 3, 2011 || Haleakala || Pan-STARRS ||  || align=right | 1.4 km || 
|-id=770 bgcolor=#E9E9E9
| 592770 ||  || — || October 3, 2013 || Mount Lemmon || Mount Lemmon Survey ||  || align=right data-sort-value="0.95" | 950 m || 
|-id=771 bgcolor=#E9E9E9
| 592771 ||  || — || March 29, 2011 || Mount Lemmon || Mount Lemmon Survey ||  || align=right | 1.2 km || 
|-id=772 bgcolor=#E9E9E9
| 592772 ||  || — || February 16, 2015 || Haleakala || Pan-STARRS ||  || align=right | 1.1 km || 
|-id=773 bgcolor=#E9E9E9
| 592773 ||  || — || January 29, 2015 || Haleakala || Pan-STARRS ||  || align=right | 1.4 km || 
|-id=774 bgcolor=#E9E9E9
| 592774 ||  || — || February 16, 2015 || Haleakala || Pan-STARRS ||  || align=right data-sort-value="0.92" | 920 m || 
|-id=775 bgcolor=#E9E9E9
| 592775 ||  || — || January 27, 2015 || Haleakala || Pan-STARRS ||  || align=right | 1.5 km || 
|-id=776 bgcolor=#E9E9E9
| 592776 ||  || — || November 27, 2013 || Haleakala || Pan-STARRS ||  || align=right data-sort-value="0.98" | 980 m || 
|-id=777 bgcolor=#E9E9E9
| 592777 ||  || — || February 16, 2015 || Haleakala || Pan-STARRS ||  || align=right | 1.8 km || 
|-id=778 bgcolor=#E9E9E9
| 592778 ||  || — || January 27, 2015 || Haleakala || Pan-STARRS ||  || align=right | 1.5 km || 
|-id=779 bgcolor=#E9E9E9
| 592779 ||  || — || February 16, 2015 || Haleakala || Pan-STARRS ||  || align=right data-sort-value="0.94" | 940 m || 
|-id=780 bgcolor=#E9E9E9
| 592780 ||  || — || November 28, 2013 || Mount Lemmon || Mount Lemmon Survey ||  || align=right | 1.5 km || 
|-id=781 bgcolor=#E9E9E9
| 592781 ||  || — || May 5, 2011 || Charleston || R. Holmes ||  || align=right | 1.3 km || 
|-id=782 bgcolor=#E9E9E9
| 592782 ||  || — || February 16, 2015 || Haleakala || Pan-STARRS ||  || align=right | 1.1 km || 
|-id=783 bgcolor=#E9E9E9
| 592783 ||  || — || May 26, 2011 || Mount Lemmon || Mount Lemmon Survey ||  || align=right | 1.7 km || 
|-id=784 bgcolor=#E9E9E9
| 592784 ||  || — || May 8, 2011 || Mount Lemmon || Mount Lemmon Survey ||  || align=right | 1.6 km || 
|-id=785 bgcolor=#E9E9E9
| 592785 ||  || — || September 25, 2008 || Mount Lemmon || Mount Lemmon Survey ||  || align=right | 1.0 km || 
|-id=786 bgcolor=#E9E9E9
| 592786 ||  || — || March 9, 2011 || Mount Lemmon || Mount Lemmon Survey ||  || align=right data-sort-value="0.78" | 780 m || 
|-id=787 bgcolor=#E9E9E9
| 592787 ||  || — || January 23, 2006 || Mount Lemmon || Mount Lemmon Survey ||  || align=right | 1.1 km || 
|-id=788 bgcolor=#E9E9E9
| 592788 ||  || — || May 27, 2011 || Kitt Peak || Spacewatch ||  || align=right | 1.8 km || 
|-id=789 bgcolor=#E9E9E9
| 592789 ||  || — || April 5, 2011 || Kitt Peak || Spacewatch ||  || align=right | 1.2 km || 
|-id=790 bgcolor=#E9E9E9
| 592790 ||  || — || September 6, 2008 || Mount Lemmon || Mount Lemmon Survey ||  || align=right | 1.3 km || 
|-id=791 bgcolor=#E9E9E9
| 592791 ||  || — || January 20, 2015 || Haleakala || Pan-STARRS ||  || align=right | 1.2 km || 
|-id=792 bgcolor=#fefefe
| 592792 ||  || — || September 19, 1998 || Apache Point || SDSS Collaboration ||  || align=right data-sort-value="0.73" | 730 m || 
|-id=793 bgcolor=#E9E9E9
| 592793 ||  || — || May 14, 2008 || Kitt Peak || Spacewatch ||  || align=right data-sort-value="0.96" | 960 m || 
|-id=794 bgcolor=#E9E9E9
| 592794 ||  || — || April 13, 2011 || Kitt Peak || Spacewatch ||  || align=right | 1.5 km || 
|-id=795 bgcolor=#E9E9E9
| 592795 ||  || — || November 23, 2009 || Mount Lemmon || Mount Lemmon Survey ||  || align=right data-sort-value="0.61" | 610 m || 
|-id=796 bgcolor=#E9E9E9
| 592796 ||  || — || January 8, 2011 || Mount Lemmon || Mount Lemmon Survey ||  || align=right | 1.2 km || 
|-id=797 bgcolor=#E9E9E9
| 592797 ||  || — || February 10, 2015 || Mount Lemmon || Mount Lemmon Survey ||  || align=right | 1.8 km || 
|-id=798 bgcolor=#E9E9E9
| 592798 ||  || — || February 27, 2006 || Kitt Peak || Spacewatch ||  || align=right | 1.4 km || 
|-id=799 bgcolor=#E9E9E9
| 592799 ||  || — || March 14, 2007 || Kitt Peak || Spacewatch ||  || align=right data-sort-value="0.95" | 950 m || 
|-id=800 bgcolor=#E9E9E9
| 592800 ||  || — || January 22, 2015 || Haleakala || Pan-STARRS ||  || align=right | 1.1 km || 
|}

592801–592900 

|-bgcolor=#E9E9E9
| 592801 ||  || — || January 23, 2015 || Haleakala || Pan-STARRS ||  || align=right | 1.5 km || 
|-id=802 bgcolor=#E9E9E9
| 592802 ||  || — || January 27, 2015 || Haleakala || Pan-STARRS ||  || align=right | 1.3 km || 
|-id=803 bgcolor=#E9E9E9
| 592803 ||  || — || January 25, 2015 || Haleakala || Pan-STARRS ||  || align=right | 1.4 km || 
|-id=804 bgcolor=#E9E9E9
| 592804 ||  || — || March 17, 2007 || Kitt Peak || Spacewatch ||  || align=right | 1.2 km || 
|-id=805 bgcolor=#E9E9E9
| 592805 ||  || — || March 23, 2003 || Apache Point || SDSS Collaboration ||  || align=right | 1.3 km || 
|-id=806 bgcolor=#E9E9E9
| 592806 ||  || — || April 11, 2002 || Palomar || NEAT ||  || align=right | 2.5 km || 
|-id=807 bgcolor=#d6d6d6
| 592807 ||  || — || December 29, 2014 || Haleakala || Pan-STARRS ||  || align=right | 2.6 km || 
|-id=808 bgcolor=#C2FFFF
| 592808 ||  || — || October 12, 2010 || Mount Lemmon || Mount Lemmon Survey || L4 || align=right | 6.8 km || 
|-id=809 bgcolor=#E9E9E9
| 592809 ||  || — || April 15, 2002 || Kitt Peak || Spacewatch || EUN || align=right | 1.3 km || 
|-id=810 bgcolor=#E9E9E9
| 592810 ||  || — || June 21, 2012 || Kitt Peak || Spacewatch ||  || align=right | 1.6 km || 
|-id=811 bgcolor=#E9E9E9
| 592811 ||  || — || September 23, 2008 || Mount Lemmon || Mount Lemmon Survey ||  || align=right | 1.6 km || 
|-id=812 bgcolor=#E9E9E9
| 592812 ||  || — || April 1, 2011 || Mount Lemmon || Mount Lemmon Survey ||  || align=right data-sort-value="0.98" | 980 m || 
|-id=813 bgcolor=#C2FFFF
| 592813 ||  || — || December 22, 2012 || Haleakala || Pan-STARRS || L4 || align=right | 8.7 km || 
|-id=814 bgcolor=#E9E9E9
| 592814 ||  || — || December 1, 2005 || Kitt Peak || Spacewatch ||  || align=right | 1.1 km || 
|-id=815 bgcolor=#E9E9E9
| 592815 ||  || — || November 1, 2005 || Catalina || CSS ||  || align=right | 1.0 km || 
|-id=816 bgcolor=#E9E9E9
| 592816 ||  || — || May 9, 2007 || Kitt Peak || Spacewatch ||  || align=right data-sort-value="0.82" | 820 m || 
|-id=817 bgcolor=#E9E9E9
| 592817 ||  || — || December 29, 2014 || Haleakala || Pan-STARRS ||  || align=right | 1.9 km || 
|-id=818 bgcolor=#E9E9E9
| 592818 ||  || — || October 3, 2013 || Mount Lemmon || Mount Lemmon Survey ||  || align=right | 1.5 km || 
|-id=819 bgcolor=#E9E9E9
| 592819 ||  || — || February 17, 2007 || Mount Lemmon || Mount Lemmon Survey ||  || align=right | 1.1 km || 
|-id=820 bgcolor=#E9E9E9
| 592820 ||  || — || October 30, 2013 || Haleakala || Pan-STARRS ||  || align=right | 1.1 km || 
|-id=821 bgcolor=#E9E9E9
| 592821 ||  || — || October 25, 2005 || Mount Lemmon || Mount Lemmon Survey ||  || align=right data-sort-value="0.96" | 960 m || 
|-id=822 bgcolor=#E9E9E9
| 592822 ||  || — || February 23, 2011 || Catalina || CSS ||  || align=right data-sort-value="0.71" | 710 m || 
|-id=823 bgcolor=#fefefe
| 592823 ||  || — || November 30, 2010 || Mount Lemmon || Mount Lemmon Survey ||  || align=right data-sort-value="0.68" | 680 m || 
|-id=824 bgcolor=#E9E9E9
| 592824 ||  || — || April 3, 2011 || Haleakala || Pan-STARRS ||  || align=right | 1.4 km || 
|-id=825 bgcolor=#E9E9E9
| 592825 ||  || — || May 7, 2006 || Kitt Peak || Spacewatch ||  || align=right | 1.9 km || 
|-id=826 bgcolor=#E9E9E9
| 592826 ||  || — || December 29, 2014 || Haleakala || Pan-STARRS ||  || align=right | 1.4 km || 
|-id=827 bgcolor=#fefefe
| 592827 ||  || — || February 27, 2007 || Kitt Peak || Spacewatch || H || align=right data-sort-value="0.47" | 470 m || 
|-id=828 bgcolor=#fefefe
| 592828 ||  || — || September 16, 2003 || Kitt Peak || Spacewatch || H || align=right data-sort-value="0.76" | 760 m || 
|-id=829 bgcolor=#E9E9E9
| 592829 ||  || — || November 27, 2013 || Haleakala || Pan-STARRS ||  || align=right | 1.6 km || 
|-id=830 bgcolor=#E9E9E9
| 592830 ||  || — || February 18, 2015 || Haleakala || Pan-STARRS ||  || align=right | 1.1 km || 
|-id=831 bgcolor=#E9E9E9
| 592831 ||  || — || January 25, 2015 || Haleakala || Pan-STARRS ||  || align=right data-sort-value="0.85" | 850 m || 
|-id=832 bgcolor=#E9E9E9
| 592832 ||  || — || January 16, 2015 || Haleakala || Pan-STARRS ||  || align=right | 1.2 km || 
|-id=833 bgcolor=#E9E9E9
| 592833 ||  || — || November 29, 2013 || Mount Lemmon || Mount Lemmon Survey ||  || align=right | 1.6 km || 
|-id=834 bgcolor=#E9E9E9
| 592834 ||  || — || September 16, 2003 || Kitt Peak || Spacewatch ||  || align=right | 1.8 km || 
|-id=835 bgcolor=#E9E9E9
| 592835 ||  || — || October 5, 2013 || Haleakala || Pan-STARRS ||  || align=right | 1.2 km || 
|-id=836 bgcolor=#E9E9E9
| 592836 ||  || — || August 21, 2004 || Siding Spring || SSS ||  || align=right | 1.5 km || 
|-id=837 bgcolor=#E9E9E9
| 592837 ||  || — || November 6, 2005 || Kitt Peak || Spacewatch ||  || align=right | 1.5 km || 
|-id=838 bgcolor=#E9E9E9
| 592838 ||  || — || January 23, 2015 || Haleakala || Pan-STARRS ||  || align=right | 1.3 km || 
|-id=839 bgcolor=#E9E9E9
| 592839 ||  || — || January 7, 2006 || Kitt Peak || Spacewatch ||  || align=right | 1.6 km || 
|-id=840 bgcolor=#E9E9E9
| 592840 ||  || — || October 9, 2008 || Mount Lemmon || Mount Lemmon Survey ||  || align=right | 2.3 km || 
|-id=841 bgcolor=#E9E9E9
| 592841 ||  || — || January 25, 2014 || Haleakala || Pan-STARRS ||  || align=right | 2.3 km || 
|-id=842 bgcolor=#E9E9E9
| 592842 ||  || — || December 2, 2005 || Kitt Peak || Spacewatch ||  || align=right | 1.1 km || 
|-id=843 bgcolor=#C2FFFF
| 592843 ||  || — || September 27, 2009 || Mount Lemmon || Mount Lemmon Survey || L4 || align=right | 8.9 km || 
|-id=844 bgcolor=#E9E9E9
| 592844 ||  || — || February 14, 2002 || Kitt Peak || Spacewatch ||  || align=right | 1.2 km || 
|-id=845 bgcolor=#E9E9E9
| 592845 ||  || — || May 26, 2011 || Mount Lemmon || Mount Lemmon Survey ||  || align=right | 1.8 km || 
|-id=846 bgcolor=#E9E9E9
| 592846 ||  || — || December 30, 2014 || Mount Lemmon || Mount Lemmon Survey ||  || align=right data-sort-value="0.86" | 860 m || 
|-id=847 bgcolor=#E9E9E9
| 592847 ||  || — || September 20, 2003 || Kitt Peak || Spacewatch ||  || align=right | 2.3 km || 
|-id=848 bgcolor=#E9E9E9
| 592848 ||  || — || January 20, 2015 || Haleakala || Pan-STARRS ||  || align=right | 1.8 km || 
|-id=849 bgcolor=#fefefe
| 592849 ||  || — || January 10, 2007 || Kitt Peak || Spacewatch ||  || align=right data-sort-value="0.89" | 890 m || 
|-id=850 bgcolor=#E9E9E9
| 592850 ||  || — || March 4, 2011 || Kitt Peak || Spacewatch ||  || align=right data-sort-value="0.77" | 770 m || 
|-id=851 bgcolor=#E9E9E9
| 592851 ||  || — || April 29, 2003 || Kitt Peak || Spacewatch ||  || align=right | 1.1 km || 
|-id=852 bgcolor=#fefefe
| 592852 ||  || — || September 18, 2010 || Mount Lemmon || Mount Lemmon Survey || H || align=right data-sort-value="0.58" | 580 m || 
|-id=853 bgcolor=#fefefe
| 592853 ||  || — || December 30, 2011 || Kitt Peak || Spacewatch || H || align=right data-sort-value="0.47" | 470 m || 
|-id=854 bgcolor=#E9E9E9
| 592854 ||  || — || July 25, 2003 || Palomar || NEAT ||  || align=right | 2.1 km || 
|-id=855 bgcolor=#E9E9E9
| 592855 ||  || — || February 16, 2015 || Haleakala || Pan-STARRS ||  || align=right | 1.5 km || 
|-id=856 bgcolor=#E9E9E9
| 592856 ||  || — || November 26, 2013 || Haleakala || Pan-STARRS ||  || align=right | 1.9 km || 
|-id=857 bgcolor=#E9E9E9
| 592857 ||  || — || October 17, 2009 || Mount Lemmon || Mount Lemmon Survey ||  || align=right data-sort-value="0.60" | 600 m || 
|-id=858 bgcolor=#E9E9E9
| 592858 ||  || — || March 28, 2011 || Mount Lemmon || Mount Lemmon Survey ||  || align=right | 1.1 km || 
|-id=859 bgcolor=#E9E9E9
| 592859 ||  || — || February 16, 2015 || Haleakala || Pan-STARRS ||  || align=right | 1.1 km || 
|-id=860 bgcolor=#E9E9E9
| 592860 ||  || — || February 20, 2015 || Haleakala || Pan-STARRS ||  || align=right | 2.0 km || 
|-id=861 bgcolor=#d6d6d6
| 592861 ||  || — || February 23, 2015 || Haleakala || Pan-STARRS ||  || align=right | 1.8 km || 
|-id=862 bgcolor=#E9E9E9
| 592862 ||  || — || February 27, 2015 || Haleakala || Pan-STARRS ||  || align=right | 1.7 km || 
|-id=863 bgcolor=#fefefe
| 592863 ||  || — || February 20, 2015 || Haleakala || Pan-STARRS || H || align=right data-sort-value="0.67" | 670 m || 
|-id=864 bgcolor=#E9E9E9
| 592864 ||  || — || February 24, 2015 || Haleakala || Pan-STARRS ||  || align=right | 1.1 km || 
|-id=865 bgcolor=#C2FFFF
| 592865 ||  || — || February 27, 2015 || Haleakala || Pan-STARRS || L4 || align=right | 7.5 km || 
|-id=866 bgcolor=#E9E9E9
| 592866 ||  || — || February 16, 2015 || Haleakala || Pan-STARRS ||  || align=right data-sort-value="0.93" | 930 m || 
|-id=867 bgcolor=#E9E9E9
| 592867 ||  || — || February 24, 2015 || Haleakala || Pan-STARRS ||  || align=right | 1.8 km || 
|-id=868 bgcolor=#E9E9E9
| 592868 ||  || — || February 16, 2015 || Haleakala || Pan-STARRS ||  || align=right | 1.4 km || 
|-id=869 bgcolor=#E9E9E9
| 592869 ||  || — || February 23, 2015 || Haleakala || Pan-STARRS ||  || align=right | 2.0 km || 
|-id=870 bgcolor=#E9E9E9
| 592870 ||  || — || June 7, 2011 || Mount Lemmon || Mount Lemmon Survey ||  || align=right | 1.5 km || 
|-id=871 bgcolor=#E9E9E9
| 592871 ||  || — || February 27, 2015 || Haleakala || Pan-STARRS ||  || align=right | 1.6 km || 
|-id=872 bgcolor=#E9E9E9
| 592872 ||  || — || February 17, 2015 || Haleakala || Pan-STARRS ||  || align=right | 1.1 km || 
|-id=873 bgcolor=#E9E9E9
| 592873 ||  || — || February 19, 2015 || Haleakala || Pan-STARRS ||  || align=right | 1.5 km || 
|-id=874 bgcolor=#E9E9E9
| 592874 ||  || — || February 16, 2015 || Haleakala || Pan-STARRS ||  || align=right | 1.7 km || 
|-id=875 bgcolor=#C2FFFF
| 592875 ||  || — || February 17, 2015 || Haleakala || Pan-STARRS || L4 || align=right | 7.4 km || 
|-id=876 bgcolor=#E9E9E9
| 592876 ||  || — || February 17, 2015 || Haleakala || Pan-STARRS ||  || align=right | 1.8 km || 
|-id=877 bgcolor=#fefefe
| 592877 ||  || — || February 27, 2015 || Catalina || CSS ||  || align=right data-sort-value="0.96" | 960 m || 
|-id=878 bgcolor=#E9E9E9
| 592878 ||  || — || November 26, 2014 || Haleakala || Pan-STARRS ||  || align=right | 1.1 km || 
|-id=879 bgcolor=#E9E9E9
| 592879 ||  || — || September 4, 2008 || Kitt Peak || Spacewatch ||  || align=right | 1.5 km || 
|-id=880 bgcolor=#fefefe
| 592880 ||  || — || May 16, 2010 || Catalina || CSS || H || align=right data-sort-value="0.77" | 770 m || 
|-id=881 bgcolor=#E9E9E9
| 592881 ||  || — || March 13, 2002 || Palomar || NEAT ||  || align=right | 1.8 km || 
|-id=882 bgcolor=#E9E9E9
| 592882 ||  || — || April 9, 2003 || Kitt Peak || Spacewatch ||  || align=right data-sort-value="0.80" | 800 m || 
|-id=883 bgcolor=#E9E9E9
| 592883 ||  || — || February 13, 2011 || Mount Lemmon || Mount Lemmon Survey ||  || align=right | 1.0 km || 
|-id=884 bgcolor=#E9E9E9
| 592884 ||  || — || October 10, 2008 || Mount Lemmon || Mount Lemmon Survey ||  || align=right | 1.4 km || 
|-id=885 bgcolor=#E9E9E9
| 592885 ||  || — || March 15, 2007 || Mount Lemmon || Mount Lemmon Survey ||  || align=right | 1.5 km || 
|-id=886 bgcolor=#E9E9E9
| 592886 ||  || — || April 7, 2003 || Kitt Peak || Spacewatch ||  || align=right data-sort-value="0.94" | 940 m || 
|-id=887 bgcolor=#E9E9E9
| 592887 ||  || — || October 14, 2001 || Apache Point || SDSS Collaboration ||  || align=right data-sort-value="0.84" | 840 m || 
|-id=888 bgcolor=#fefefe
| 592888 ||  || — || March 2, 2005 || Kitt Peak || Spacewatch || H || align=right data-sort-value="0.54" | 540 m || 
|-id=889 bgcolor=#E9E9E9
| 592889 ||  || — || January 23, 2015 || Haleakala || Pan-STARRS ||  || align=right | 1.1 km || 
|-id=890 bgcolor=#E9E9E9
| 592890 ||  || — || January 25, 2015 || Haleakala || Pan-STARRS ||  || align=right data-sort-value="0.79" | 790 m || 
|-id=891 bgcolor=#E9E9E9
| 592891 ||  || — || January 22, 2015 || Haleakala || Pan-STARRS ||  || align=right | 1.0 km || 
|-id=892 bgcolor=#E9E9E9
| 592892 ||  || — || March 2, 2006 || Kitt Peak || Spacewatch ||  || align=right | 1.5 km || 
|-id=893 bgcolor=#E9E9E9
| 592893 ||  || — || October 13, 2013 || Mount Lemmon || Mount Lemmon Survey ||  || align=right data-sort-value="0.95" | 950 m || 
|-id=894 bgcolor=#fefefe
| 592894 ||  || — || December 8, 2010 || Mount Lemmon || Mount Lemmon Survey ||  || align=right data-sort-value="0.70" | 700 m || 
|-id=895 bgcolor=#E9E9E9
| 592895 ||  || — || October 26, 2001 || Haleakala || AMOS ||  || align=right | 1.1 km || 
|-id=896 bgcolor=#E9E9E9
| 592896 ||  || — || November 6, 2013 || Haleakala || Pan-STARRS ||  || align=right | 1.1 km || 
|-id=897 bgcolor=#E9E9E9
| 592897 ||  || — || March 11, 2015 || Mount Lemmon || Mount Lemmon Survey ||  || align=right | 1.2 km || 
|-id=898 bgcolor=#E9E9E9
| 592898 ||  || — || October 7, 2005 || Mauna Kea || Mauna Kea Obs. ||  || align=right | 1.7 km || 
|-id=899 bgcolor=#E9E9E9
| 592899 ||  || — || October 23, 2013 || Mount Lemmon || Mount Lemmon Survey ||  || align=right | 1.1 km || 
|-id=900 bgcolor=#E9E9E9
| 592900 ||  || — || February 15, 2015 || Haleakala || Pan-STARRS ||  || align=right | 1.0 km || 
|}

592901–593000 

|-bgcolor=#E9E9E9
| 592901 ||  || — || February 17, 2007 || Mount Lemmon || Mount Lemmon Survey ||  || align=right | 1.1 km || 
|-id=902 bgcolor=#E9E9E9
| 592902 ||  || — || January 21, 2015 || Haleakala || Pan-STARRS ||  || align=right | 1.5 km || 
|-id=903 bgcolor=#E9E9E9
| 592903 ||  || — || September 9, 2004 || Kitt Peak || Spacewatch ||  || align=right | 1.3 km || 
|-id=904 bgcolor=#E9E9E9
| 592904 ||  || — || July 9, 2003 || Kitt Peak || Spacewatch ||  || align=right | 1.9 km || 
|-id=905 bgcolor=#E9E9E9
| 592905 ||  || — || November 27, 2013 || Haleakala || Pan-STARRS ||  || align=right | 2.5 km || 
|-id=906 bgcolor=#E9E9E9
| 592906 ||  || — || September 16, 2013 || Mount Lemmon || Mount Lemmon Survey ||  || align=right | 1.5 km || 
|-id=907 bgcolor=#E9E9E9
| 592907 ||  || — || October 15, 2013 || Kitt Peak || Spacewatch ||  || align=right data-sort-value="0.99" | 990 m || 
|-id=908 bgcolor=#E9E9E9
| 592908 ||  || — || January 13, 2011 || Kitt Peak || Spacewatch ||  || align=right data-sort-value="0.67" | 670 m || 
|-id=909 bgcolor=#fefefe
| 592909 ||  || — || October 26, 2011 || Haleakala || Pan-STARRS || H || align=right data-sort-value="0.40" | 400 m || 
|-id=910 bgcolor=#E9E9E9
| 592910 ||  || — || July 13, 2013 || Haleakala || Pan-STARRS ||  || align=right | 1.0 km || 
|-id=911 bgcolor=#E9E9E9
| 592911 ||  || — || March 15, 2015 || Haleakala || Pan-STARRS ||  || align=right | 2.0 km || 
|-id=912 bgcolor=#fefefe
| 592912 ||  || — || February 16, 2005 || La Silla || A. Boattini || H || align=right data-sort-value="0.60" | 600 m || 
|-id=913 bgcolor=#FA8072
| 592913 ||  || — || October 20, 2006 || Mount Lemmon || Mount Lemmon Survey ||  || align=right data-sort-value="0.43" | 430 m || 
|-id=914 bgcolor=#E9E9E9
| 592914 ||  || — || May 13, 1999 || Socorro || LINEAR ||  || align=right | 1.7 km || 
|-id=915 bgcolor=#E9E9E9
| 592915 ||  || — || February 7, 2011 || Mount Lemmon || Mount Lemmon Survey ||  || align=right | 1.1 km || 
|-id=916 bgcolor=#E9E9E9
| 592916 ||  || — || February 18, 2015 || Haleakala || Pan-STARRS ||  || align=right | 2.0 km || 
|-id=917 bgcolor=#E9E9E9
| 592917 ||  || — || January 21, 2015 || Haleakala || Pan-STARRS ||  || align=right | 2.1 km || 
|-id=918 bgcolor=#E9E9E9
| 592918 ||  || — || November 11, 2013 || Mount Lemmon || Mount Lemmon Survey ||  || align=right | 1.5 km || 
|-id=919 bgcolor=#E9E9E9
| 592919 ||  || — || March 16, 2015 || Haleakala || Pan-STARRS ||  || align=right | 1.7 km || 
|-id=920 bgcolor=#E9E9E9
| 592920 ||  || — || March 16, 2015 || Haleakala || Pan-STARRS ||  || align=right | 1.6 km || 
|-id=921 bgcolor=#C2FFFF
| 592921 ||  || — || January 16, 2013 || Haleakala || Pan-STARRS || L4 || align=right | 7.2 km || 
|-id=922 bgcolor=#C2FFFF
| 592922 ||  || — || February 24, 2014 || Haleakala || Pan-STARRS || L4 || align=right | 8.0 km || 
|-id=923 bgcolor=#E9E9E9
| 592923 ||  || — || December 14, 2004 || Socorro || LINEAR ||  || align=right | 1.8 km || 
|-id=924 bgcolor=#E9E9E9
| 592924 ||  || — || March 16, 2015 || Haleakala || Pan-STARRS ||  || align=right | 1.9 km || 
|-id=925 bgcolor=#E9E9E9
| 592925 ||  || — || May 3, 2011 || Mount Lemmon || Mount Lemmon Survey ||  || align=right | 1.5 km || 
|-id=926 bgcolor=#E9E9E9
| 592926 ||  || — || March 16, 2015 || Haleakala || Pan-STARRS ||  || align=right | 1.8 km || 
|-id=927 bgcolor=#C2FFFF
| 592927 ||  || — || February 21, 2014 || Kitt Peak || Spacewatch || L4 || align=right | 7.5 km || 
|-id=928 bgcolor=#E9E9E9
| 592928 ||  || — || November 27, 2013 || Haleakala || Pan-STARRS ||  || align=right | 1.1 km || 
|-id=929 bgcolor=#E9E9E9
| 592929 ||  || — || February 16, 2015 || Haleakala || Pan-STARRS ||  || align=right | 1.2 km || 
|-id=930 bgcolor=#d6d6d6
| 592930 ||  || — || October 20, 2012 || Haleakala || Pan-STARRS ||  || align=right | 2.8 km || 
|-id=931 bgcolor=#C2FFFF
| 592931 ||  || — || November 13, 2010 || Mount Lemmon || Mount Lemmon Survey || L4 || align=right | 7.1 km || 
|-id=932 bgcolor=#E9E9E9
| 592932 ||  || — || February 27, 2015 || Mount Lemmon || Mount Lemmon Survey ||  || align=right | 2.0 km || 
|-id=933 bgcolor=#E9E9E9
| 592933 ||  || — || February 27, 2015 || Mount Lemmon || Mount Lemmon Survey ||  || align=right data-sort-value="0.98" | 980 m || 
|-id=934 bgcolor=#fefefe
| 592934 ||  || — || February 18, 2015 || Haleakala || Pan-STARRS || H || align=right data-sort-value="0.65" | 650 m || 
|-id=935 bgcolor=#fefefe
| 592935 ||  || — || March 9, 2007 || Mount Lemmon || Mount Lemmon Survey || H || align=right data-sort-value="0.59" | 590 m || 
|-id=936 bgcolor=#E9E9E9
| 592936 ||  || — || September 29, 2008 || Kitt Peak || Spacewatch ||  || align=right | 1.7 km || 
|-id=937 bgcolor=#E9E9E9
| 592937 ||  || — || October 14, 2013 || Mount Lemmon || Mount Lemmon Survey ||  || align=right | 1.3 km || 
|-id=938 bgcolor=#E9E9E9
| 592938 ||  || — || February 8, 2011 || Mount Lemmon || Mount Lemmon Survey ||  || align=right | 1.3 km || 
|-id=939 bgcolor=#E9E9E9
| 592939 ||  || — || April 19, 2007 || Kitt Peak || Spacewatch ||  || align=right data-sort-value="0.97" | 970 m || 
|-id=940 bgcolor=#fefefe
| 592940 ||  || — || February 17, 2007 || Mount Lemmon || Mount Lemmon Survey || H || align=right data-sort-value="0.42" | 420 m || 
|-id=941 bgcolor=#E9E9E9
| 592941 ||  || — || March 18, 2015 || Haleakala || Pan-STARRS ||  || align=right | 1.8 km || 
|-id=942 bgcolor=#E9E9E9
| 592942 ||  || — || February 18, 2015 || Haleakala || Pan-STARRS ||  || align=right | 1.5 km || 
|-id=943 bgcolor=#E9E9E9
| 592943 ||  || — || November 2, 2013 || Kitt Peak || Spacewatch ||  || align=right | 1.2 km || 
|-id=944 bgcolor=#E9E9E9
| 592944 ||  || — || January 31, 2015 || Haleakala || Pan-STARRS ||  || align=right | 1.3 km || 
|-id=945 bgcolor=#E9E9E9
| 592945 ||  || — || March 18, 2015 || Haleakala || Pan-STARRS ||  || align=right | 1.1 km || 
|-id=946 bgcolor=#C2FFFF
| 592946 ||  || — || December 3, 2010 || Mount Lemmon || Mount Lemmon Survey || L4 || align=right | 10 km || 
|-id=947 bgcolor=#E9E9E9
| 592947 ||  || — || October 10, 2007 || Mount Lemmon || Mount Lemmon Survey ||  || align=right | 1.8 km || 
|-id=948 bgcolor=#C2FFFF
| 592948 ||  || — || October 15, 2009 || Mount Lemmon || Mount Lemmon Survey || L4 || align=right | 8.2 km || 
|-id=949 bgcolor=#E9E9E9
| 592949 ||  || — || March 18, 2015 || Haleakala || Pan-STARRS ||  || align=right | 1.3 km || 
|-id=950 bgcolor=#E9E9E9
| 592950 ||  || — || December 7, 2005 || Catalina || CSS ||  || align=right data-sort-value="0.74" | 740 m || 
|-id=951 bgcolor=#E9E9E9
| 592951 ||  || — || October 21, 2012 || Haleakala || Pan-STARRS ||  || align=right | 2.0 km || 
|-id=952 bgcolor=#E9E9E9
| 592952 ||  || — || May 8, 2011 || Mount Lemmon || Mount Lemmon Survey ||  || align=right | 1.5 km || 
|-id=953 bgcolor=#E9E9E9
| 592953 ||  || — || March 20, 2015 || Haleakala || Pan-STARRS ||  || align=right | 1.1 km || 
|-id=954 bgcolor=#E9E9E9
| 592954 ||  || — || November 25, 2005 || Kitt Peak || Spacewatch ||  || align=right data-sort-value="0.85" | 850 m || 
|-id=955 bgcolor=#E9E9E9
| 592955 ||  || — || January 22, 2015 || Haleakala || Pan-STARRS ||  || align=right | 1.6 km || 
|-id=956 bgcolor=#E9E9E9
| 592956 ||  || — || September 15, 2013 || Mount Lemmon || Mount Lemmon Survey ||  || align=right | 1.2 km || 
|-id=957 bgcolor=#E9E9E9
| 592957 ||  || — || November 28, 2013 || Mount Lemmon || Mount Lemmon Survey ||  || align=right | 1.3 km || 
|-id=958 bgcolor=#E9E9E9
| 592958 ||  || — || September 22, 2008 || Kitt Peak || Spacewatch ||  || align=right | 2.0 km || 
|-id=959 bgcolor=#E9E9E9
| 592959 ||  || — || January 22, 2015 || Haleakala || Pan-STARRS ||  || align=right | 1.3 km || 
|-id=960 bgcolor=#E9E9E9
| 592960 ||  || — || October 9, 2012 || Haleakala || Pan-STARRS ||  || align=right | 1.6 km || 
|-id=961 bgcolor=#E9E9E9
| 592961 ||  || — || May 22, 2011 || Mount Lemmon || Mount Lemmon Survey ||  || align=right | 1.9 km || 
|-id=962 bgcolor=#E9E9E9
| 592962 ||  || — || September 19, 2003 || Kitt Peak || Spacewatch ||  || align=right | 1.8 km || 
|-id=963 bgcolor=#E9E9E9
| 592963 ||  || — || September 25, 2012 || Mount Lemmon || Mount Lemmon Survey ||  || align=right | 1.6 km || 
|-id=964 bgcolor=#E9E9E9
| 592964 ||  || — || September 7, 2004 || Palomar || NEAT || MAR || align=right | 1.7 km || 
|-id=965 bgcolor=#E9E9E9
| 592965 ||  || — || May 3, 2011 || Mount Lemmon || Mount Lemmon Survey ||  || align=right | 1.3 km || 
|-id=966 bgcolor=#E9E9E9
| 592966 ||  || — || February 16, 2015 || Haleakala || Pan-STARRS ||  || align=right | 1.5 km || 
|-id=967 bgcolor=#fefefe
| 592967 ||  || — || February 16, 2015 || Haleakala || Pan-STARRS || H || align=right data-sort-value="0.56" | 560 m || 
|-id=968 bgcolor=#FFC2E0
| 592968 ||  || — || March 25, 2015 || Haleakala || Pan-STARRS || ATE || align=right data-sort-value="0.17" | 170 m || 
|-id=969 bgcolor=#E9E9E9
| 592969 ||  || — || April 8, 2006 || Kitt Peak || Spacewatch ||  || align=right | 1.5 km || 
|-id=970 bgcolor=#E9E9E9
| 592970 ||  || — || November 19, 2009 || Kitt Peak || Spacewatch ||  || align=right | 1.3 km || 
|-id=971 bgcolor=#E9E9E9
| 592971 ||  || — || December 11, 2009 || Mount Lemmon || Mount Lemmon Survey ||  || align=right | 1.9 km || 
|-id=972 bgcolor=#E9E9E9
| 592972 ||  || — || October 9, 2008 || Mount Lemmon || Mount Lemmon Survey ||  || align=right | 1.1 km || 
|-id=973 bgcolor=#E9E9E9
| 592973 ||  || — || January 21, 2015 || Haleakala || Pan-STARRS ||  || align=right | 1.2 km || 
|-id=974 bgcolor=#E9E9E9
| 592974 ||  || — || February 12, 2002 || Socorro || LINEAR ||  || align=right | 1.3 km || 
|-id=975 bgcolor=#E9E9E9
| 592975 ||  || — || October 31, 2005 || Mauna Kea || Mauna Kea Obs. ||  || align=right | 1.4 km || 
|-id=976 bgcolor=#E9E9E9
| 592976 ||  || — || March 21, 2015 || Haleakala || Pan-STARRS ||  || align=right | 1.7 km || 
|-id=977 bgcolor=#C2FFFF
| 592977 ||  || — || March 27, 2003 || Kitt Peak || Spacewatch || L4 || align=right | 8.6 km || 
|-id=978 bgcolor=#E9E9E9
| 592978 ||  || — || March 26, 2006 || Mount Lemmon || Mount Lemmon Survey ||  || align=right | 1.6 km || 
|-id=979 bgcolor=#C2FFFF
| 592979 ||  || — || September 25, 2008 || Mount Lemmon || Mount Lemmon Survey || L4 || align=right | 9.2 km || 
|-id=980 bgcolor=#E9E9E9
| 592980 ||  || — || September 29, 2008 || Kitt Peak || Spacewatch ||  || align=right | 1.4 km || 
|-id=981 bgcolor=#E9E9E9
| 592981 ||  || — || March 17, 2015 || Mount Lemmon || Mount Lemmon Survey ||  || align=right | 1.7 km || 
|-id=982 bgcolor=#E9E9E9
| 592982 ||  || — || March 2, 2006 || Kitt Peak || Spacewatch ||  || align=right | 1.1 km || 
|-id=983 bgcolor=#E9E9E9
| 592983 ||  || — || April 24, 2011 || Mount Lemmon || Mount Lemmon Survey || EUN || align=right | 1.2 km || 
|-id=984 bgcolor=#E9E9E9
| 592984 ||  || — || December 31, 2013 || Mount Lemmon || Mount Lemmon Survey ||  || align=right | 1.7 km || 
|-id=985 bgcolor=#E9E9E9
| 592985 ||  || — || November 7, 2008 || Mount Lemmon || Mount Lemmon Survey ||  || align=right | 1.7 km || 
|-id=986 bgcolor=#C2FFFF
| 592986 ||  || — || January 10, 2013 || Kitt Peak || Spacewatch || L4 || align=right | 6.3 km || 
|-id=987 bgcolor=#E9E9E9
| 592987 ||  || — || September 21, 2012 || Mount Lemmon || Mount Lemmon Survey ||  || align=right | 1.7 km || 
|-id=988 bgcolor=#E9E9E9
| 592988 ||  || — || February 4, 2005 || Mount Lemmon || Mount Lemmon Survey ||  || align=right | 1.8 km || 
|-id=989 bgcolor=#C2FFFF
| 592989 ||  || — || October 17, 2010 || Mount Lemmon || Mount Lemmon Survey || L4 || align=right | 8.7 km || 
|-id=990 bgcolor=#E9E9E9
| 592990 ||  || — || March 21, 2015 || Haleakala || Pan-STARRS ||  || align=right data-sort-value="0.75" | 750 m || 
|-id=991 bgcolor=#E9E9E9
| 592991 ||  || — || December 24, 2013 || Catalina || CSS ||  || align=right | 1.00 km || 
|-id=992 bgcolor=#E9E9E9
| 592992 ||  || — || March 26, 2006 || Mount Lemmon || Mount Lemmon Survey ||  || align=right | 1.7 km || 
|-id=993 bgcolor=#E9E9E9
| 592993 ||  || — || June 2, 2003 || Cerro Tololo || M. W. Buie, K. J. Meech ||  || align=right data-sort-value="0.85" | 850 m || 
|-id=994 bgcolor=#E9E9E9
| 592994 ||  || — || September 22, 2003 || Kitt Peak || Spacewatch ||  || align=right | 1.8 km || 
|-id=995 bgcolor=#C2FFFF
| 592995 ||  || — || November 30, 2010 || Mount Lemmon || Mount Lemmon Survey || L4 || align=right | 6.7 km || 
|-id=996 bgcolor=#fefefe
| 592996 ||  || — || March 21, 2015 || Haleakala || Pan-STARRS || H || align=right data-sort-value="0.58" | 580 m || 
|-id=997 bgcolor=#C2FFFF
| 592997 ||  || — || November 14, 2010 || Kitt Peak || Spacewatch || L4 || align=right | 8.2 km || 
|-id=998 bgcolor=#E9E9E9
| 592998 ||  || — || September 14, 2002 || Palomar || NEAT ||  || align=right | 1.8 km || 
|-id=999 bgcolor=#E9E9E9
| 592999 ||  || — || October 11, 2012 || Mount Lemmon || Mount Lemmon Survey ||  || align=right | 2.2 km || 
|-id=000 bgcolor=#E9E9E9
| 593000 ||  || — || May 8, 2011 || Mount Lemmon || Mount Lemmon Survey ||  || align=right | 2.1 km || 
|}

References

External links 
 Discovery Circumstances: Numbered Minor Planets (590001)–(595000) (IAU Minor Planet Center)

0592